

266001–266100 

|-bgcolor=#d6d6d6
| 266001 ||  || — || February 25, 2006 || Kitt Peak || Spacewatch || KOR || align=right | 2.2 km || 
|-id=002 bgcolor=#d6d6d6
| 266002 ||  || — || February 27, 2006 || Mount Lemmon || Mount Lemmon Survey || THM || align=right | 2.8 km || 
|-id=003 bgcolor=#d6d6d6
| 266003 ||  || — || February 27, 2006 || Kitt Peak || Spacewatch || — || align=right | 3.0 km || 
|-id=004 bgcolor=#d6d6d6
| 266004 ||  || — || February 28, 2006 || Socorro || LINEAR || — || align=right | 5.1 km || 
|-id=005 bgcolor=#d6d6d6
| 266005 ||  || — || February 23, 2006 || Anderson Mesa || LONEOS || — || align=right | 4.3 km || 
|-id=006 bgcolor=#d6d6d6
| 266006 ||  || — || February 20, 2006 || Socorro || LINEAR || — || align=right | 5.0 km || 
|-id=007 bgcolor=#d6d6d6
| 266007 ||  || — || March 2, 2006 || Kitt Peak || Spacewatch || — || align=right | 3.5 km || 
|-id=008 bgcolor=#d6d6d6
| 266008 ||  || — || March 2, 2006 || Kitt Peak || Spacewatch || THM || align=right | 2.5 km || 
|-id=009 bgcolor=#d6d6d6
| 266009 ||  || — || March 3, 2006 || Kitt Peak || Spacewatch || — || align=right | 1.9 km || 
|-id=010 bgcolor=#d6d6d6
| 266010 ||  || — || March 3, 2006 || Mount Lemmon || Mount Lemmon Survey || — || align=right | 4.0 km || 
|-id=011 bgcolor=#d6d6d6
| 266011 ||  || — || March 3, 2006 || Kitt Peak || Spacewatch || — || align=right | 3.7 km || 
|-id=012 bgcolor=#d6d6d6
| 266012 ||  || — || March 3, 2006 || Mount Lemmon || Mount Lemmon Survey || — || align=right | 2.4 km || 
|-id=013 bgcolor=#d6d6d6
| 266013 ||  || — || March 3, 2006 || Mount Lemmon || Mount Lemmon Survey || — || align=right | 3.2 km || 
|-id=014 bgcolor=#d6d6d6
| 266014 ||  || — || March 4, 2006 || Catalina || CSS || ALA || align=right | 5.8 km || 
|-id=015 bgcolor=#d6d6d6
| 266015 ||  || — || March 4, 2006 || Kitt Peak || Spacewatch || ANF || align=right | 2.2 km || 
|-id=016 bgcolor=#d6d6d6
| 266016 ||  || — || March 4, 2006 || Kitt Peak || Spacewatch || — || align=right | 4.1 km || 
|-id=017 bgcolor=#d6d6d6
| 266017 ||  || — || March 5, 2006 || Kitt Peak || Spacewatch || — || align=right | 4.4 km || 
|-id=018 bgcolor=#d6d6d6
| 266018 ||  || — || March 5, 2006 || Kitt Peak || Spacewatch || — || align=right | 3.6 km || 
|-id=019 bgcolor=#d6d6d6
| 266019 ||  || — || March 9, 2006 || Catalina || CSS || EUP || align=right | 6.6 km || 
|-id=020 bgcolor=#d6d6d6
| 266020 ||  || — || March 2, 2006 || Kitt Peak || Spacewatch || THM || align=right | 2.4 km || 
|-id=021 bgcolor=#d6d6d6
| 266021 ||  || — || March 23, 2006 || Kitt Peak || Spacewatch || — || align=right | 3.0 km || 
|-id=022 bgcolor=#d6d6d6
| 266022 ||  || — || March 23, 2006 || Kitt Peak || Spacewatch || — || align=right | 4.0 km || 
|-id=023 bgcolor=#d6d6d6
| 266023 ||  || — || March 23, 2006 || Socorro || LINEAR || — || align=right | 4.6 km || 
|-id=024 bgcolor=#d6d6d6
| 266024 ||  || — || March 23, 2006 || Kitt Peak || Spacewatch || THM || align=right | 3.2 km || 
|-id=025 bgcolor=#d6d6d6
| 266025 ||  || — || March 25, 2006 || Catalina || CSS || — || align=right | 5.4 km || 
|-id=026 bgcolor=#d6d6d6
| 266026 ||  || — || March 24, 2006 || Anderson Mesa || LONEOS || HYG || align=right | 4.5 km || 
|-id=027 bgcolor=#d6d6d6
| 266027 ||  || — || March 24, 2006 || Anderson Mesa || LONEOS || HYG || align=right | 4.1 km || 
|-id=028 bgcolor=#d6d6d6
| 266028 ||  || — || March 25, 2006 || Catalina || CSS || TIR || align=right | 4.5 km || 
|-id=029 bgcolor=#d6d6d6
| 266029 ||  || — || March 24, 2006 || Catalina || CSS || — || align=right | 4.3 km || 
|-id=030 bgcolor=#d6d6d6
| 266030 ||  || — || April 2, 2006 || Kitt Peak || Spacewatch || THM || align=right | 2.5 km || 
|-id=031 bgcolor=#d6d6d6
| 266031 ||  || — || April 7, 2006 || Anderson Mesa || LONEOS || THB || align=right | 4.4 km || 
|-id=032 bgcolor=#d6d6d6
| 266032 ||  || — || April 2, 2006 || Catalina || CSS || — || align=right | 7.3 km || 
|-id=033 bgcolor=#d6d6d6
| 266033 ||  || — || April 9, 2006 || Anderson Mesa || LONEOS || — || align=right | 4.2 km || 
|-id=034 bgcolor=#d6d6d6
| 266034 ||  || — || April 7, 2006 || Mount Lemmon || Mount Lemmon Survey || THM || align=right | 2.5 km || 
|-id=035 bgcolor=#d6d6d6
| 266035 ||  || — || April 6, 2006 || Catalina || CSS || — || align=right | 4.3 km || 
|-id=036 bgcolor=#d6d6d6
| 266036 ||  || — || April 19, 2006 || Kitt Peak || Spacewatch || HYG || align=right | 4.8 km || 
|-id=037 bgcolor=#d6d6d6
| 266037 ||  || — || April 18, 2006 || Kitt Peak || Spacewatch || — || align=right | 2.9 km || 
|-id=038 bgcolor=#d6d6d6
| 266038 ||  || — || April 18, 2006 || Kitt Peak || Spacewatch || HYG || align=right | 3.6 km || 
|-id=039 bgcolor=#d6d6d6
| 266039 ||  || — || April 19, 2006 || Catalina || CSS || LIX || align=right | 4.8 km || 
|-id=040 bgcolor=#fefefe
| 266040 ||  || — || April 24, 2006 || Mount Lemmon || Mount Lemmon Survey || MAS || align=right data-sort-value="0.86" | 860 m || 
|-id=041 bgcolor=#d6d6d6
| 266041 ||  || — || April 30, 2006 || Kitt Peak || Spacewatch || — || align=right | 4.2 km || 
|-id=042 bgcolor=#d6d6d6
| 266042 ||  || — || April 30, 2006 || Kitt Peak || Spacewatch || — || align=right | 3.4 km || 
|-id=043 bgcolor=#d6d6d6
| 266043 ||  || — || April 26, 2006 || Cerro Tololo || M. W. Buie || — || align=right | 3.2 km || 
|-id=044 bgcolor=#d6d6d6
| 266044 ||  || — || May 1, 2006 || Kitt Peak || Spacewatch || — || align=right | 5.2 km || 
|-id=045 bgcolor=#d6d6d6
| 266045 ||  || — || May 5, 2006 || Catalina || CSS || EUP || align=right | 4.1 km || 
|-id=046 bgcolor=#d6d6d6
| 266046 ||  || — || May 22, 2006 || Kitt Peak || Spacewatch || HYG || align=right | 3.4 km || 
|-id=047 bgcolor=#E9E9E9
| 266047 ||  || — || May 20, 2006 || Siding Spring || SSS || — || align=right | 2.2 km || 
|-id=048 bgcolor=#fefefe
| 266048 ||  || — || May 27, 2006 || Catalina || CSS || H || align=right | 1.1 km || 
|-id=049 bgcolor=#d6d6d6
| 266049 ||  || — || May 27, 2006 || Catalina || CSS || — || align=right | 5.1 km || 
|-id=050 bgcolor=#d6d6d6
| 266050 ||  || — || May 31, 2006 || Mount Lemmon || Mount Lemmon Survey || — || align=right | 4.3 km || 
|-id=051 bgcolor=#d6d6d6
| 266051 Hannawieser || 2006 NB ||  || July 1, 2006 || Winterthur || M. Griesser || EUP || align=right | 5.2 km || 
|-id=052 bgcolor=#fefefe
| 266052 ||  || — || August 12, 2006 || Palomar || NEAT || — || align=right | 2.0 km || 
|-id=053 bgcolor=#FA8072
| 266053 ||  || — || August 19, 2006 || Palomar || NEAT || — || align=right | 1.3 km || 
|-id=054 bgcolor=#fefefe
| 266054 ||  || — || August 22, 2006 || Palomar || NEAT || — || align=right | 1.0 km || 
|-id=055 bgcolor=#fefefe
| 266055 ||  || — || August 19, 2006 || Anderson Mesa || LONEOS || — || align=right data-sort-value="0.93" | 930 m || 
|-id=056 bgcolor=#fefefe
| 266056 ||  || — || August 27, 2006 || Kitt Peak || Spacewatch || — || align=right data-sort-value="0.67" | 670 m || 
|-id=057 bgcolor=#fefefe
| 266057 ||  || — || August 19, 2006 || Kitt Peak || Spacewatch || — || align=right data-sort-value="0.76" | 760 m || 
|-id=058 bgcolor=#fefefe
| 266058 ||  || — || August 25, 2006 || Lulin Observatory || C.-S. Lin, Q.-z. Ye || — || align=right data-sort-value="0.86" | 860 m || 
|-id=059 bgcolor=#fefefe
| 266059 ||  || — || August 22, 2006 || Palomar || NEAT || — || align=right data-sort-value="0.73" | 730 m || 
|-id=060 bgcolor=#d6d6d6
| 266060 ||  || — || August 20, 2006 || Palomar || NEAT || — || align=right | 5.6 km || 
|-id=061 bgcolor=#fefefe
| 266061 ||  || — || August 27, 2006 || Anderson Mesa || LONEOS || V || align=right data-sort-value="0.72" | 720 m || 
|-id=062 bgcolor=#E9E9E9
| 266062 ||  || — || August 29, 2006 || Catalina || CSS || — || align=right | 1.6 km || 
|-id=063 bgcolor=#fefefe
| 266063 ||  || — || August 18, 2006 || Kitt Peak || Spacewatch || FLO || align=right data-sort-value="0.58" | 580 m || 
|-id=064 bgcolor=#fefefe
| 266064 ||  || — || August 19, 2006 || Kitt Peak || Spacewatch || — || align=right data-sort-value="0.66" | 660 m || 
|-id=065 bgcolor=#fefefe
| 266065 ||  || — || August 19, 2006 || Kitt Peak || Spacewatch || NYS || align=right data-sort-value="0.66" | 660 m || 
|-id=066 bgcolor=#fefefe
| 266066 ||  || — || September 14, 2006 || Kitt Peak || Spacewatch || FLO || align=right data-sort-value="0.64" | 640 m || 
|-id=067 bgcolor=#fefefe
| 266067 ||  || — || September 13, 2006 || Palomar || NEAT || — || align=right data-sort-value="0.88" | 880 m || 
|-id=068 bgcolor=#fefefe
| 266068 ||  || — || September 12, 2006 || Catalina || CSS || — || align=right data-sort-value="0.82" | 820 m || 
|-id=069 bgcolor=#fefefe
| 266069 ||  || — || September 12, 2006 || Catalina || CSS || — || align=right data-sort-value="0.87" | 870 m || 
|-id=070 bgcolor=#fefefe
| 266070 ||  || — || September 14, 2006 || Kitt Peak || Spacewatch || NYS || align=right data-sort-value="0.75" | 750 m || 
|-id=071 bgcolor=#fefefe
| 266071 ||  || — || September 14, 2006 || Palomar || NEAT || — || align=right data-sort-value="0.98" | 980 m || 
|-id=072 bgcolor=#fefefe
| 266072 ||  || — || September 14, 2006 || Kitt Peak || Spacewatch || — || align=right data-sort-value="0.91" | 910 m || 
|-id=073 bgcolor=#fefefe
| 266073 ||  || — || September 14, 2006 || Kitt Peak || Spacewatch || FLO || align=right data-sort-value="0.64" | 640 m || 
|-id=074 bgcolor=#fefefe
| 266074 ||  || — || September 14, 2006 || Catalina || CSS || — || align=right data-sort-value="0.78" | 780 m || 
|-id=075 bgcolor=#E9E9E9
| 266075 ||  || — || September 15, 2006 || Kitt Peak || Spacewatch || — || align=right | 1.8 km || 
|-id=076 bgcolor=#E9E9E9
| 266076 ||  || — || September 15, 2006 || Kitt Peak || Spacewatch || — || align=right | 1.5 km || 
|-id=077 bgcolor=#fefefe
| 266077 ||  || — || September 15, 2006 || Kitt Peak || Spacewatch || — || align=right | 1.0 km || 
|-id=078 bgcolor=#fefefe
| 266078 ||  || — || September 15, 2006 || Kitt Peak || Spacewatch || FLO || align=right data-sort-value="0.74" | 740 m || 
|-id=079 bgcolor=#fefefe
| 266079 ||  || — || September 14, 2006 || Palomar || NEAT || FLO || align=right data-sort-value="0.89" | 890 m || 
|-id=080 bgcolor=#fefefe
| 266080 ||  || — || September 14, 2006 || Catalina || CSS || NYS || align=right data-sort-value="0.75" | 750 m || 
|-id=081 bgcolor=#fefefe
| 266081 Villyket ||  ||  || September 14, 2006 || Mauna Kea || J. Masiero || FLO || align=right data-sort-value="0.71" | 710 m || 
|-id=082 bgcolor=#fefefe
| 266082 ||  || — || September 15, 2006 || Kitt Peak || Spacewatch || FLO || align=right data-sort-value="0.59" | 590 m || 
|-id=083 bgcolor=#fefefe
| 266083 ||  || — || September 16, 2006 || Palomar || NEAT || — || align=right data-sort-value="0.94" | 940 m || 
|-id=084 bgcolor=#FA8072
| 266084 ||  || — || September 16, 2006 || Catalina || CSS || — || align=right | 1.1 km || 
|-id=085 bgcolor=#fefefe
| 266085 ||  || — || September 16, 2006 || Socorro || LINEAR || FLO || align=right data-sort-value="0.90" | 900 m || 
|-id=086 bgcolor=#fefefe
| 266086 ||  || — || September 16, 2006 || Anderson Mesa || LONEOS || — || align=right data-sort-value="0.81" | 810 m || 
|-id=087 bgcolor=#fefefe
| 266087 ||  || — || September 17, 2006 || Anderson Mesa || LONEOS || FLO || align=right data-sort-value="0.77" | 770 m || 
|-id=088 bgcolor=#fefefe
| 266088 ||  || — || September 16, 2006 || Catalina || CSS || FLO || align=right data-sort-value="0.80" | 800 m || 
|-id=089 bgcolor=#fefefe
| 266089 ||  || — || September 17, 2006 || Catalina || CSS || V || align=right data-sort-value="0.95" | 950 m || 
|-id=090 bgcolor=#fefefe
| 266090 ||  || — || September 17, 2006 || Kitt Peak || Spacewatch || — || align=right data-sort-value="0.88" | 880 m || 
|-id=091 bgcolor=#fefefe
| 266091 ||  || — || September 19, 2006 || Catalina || CSS || FLO || align=right data-sort-value="0.78" | 780 m || 
|-id=092 bgcolor=#fefefe
| 266092 ||  || — || September 19, 2006 || La Sagra || OAM Obs. || NYS || align=right data-sort-value="0.72" | 720 m || 
|-id=093 bgcolor=#fefefe
| 266093 ||  || — || September 18, 2006 || Kitt Peak || Spacewatch || — || align=right data-sort-value="0.92" | 920 m || 
|-id=094 bgcolor=#fefefe
| 266094 ||  || — || September 16, 2006 || Anderson Mesa || LONEOS || — || align=right | 1.0 km || 
|-id=095 bgcolor=#fefefe
| 266095 ||  || — || September 18, 2006 || Catalina || CSS || — || align=right data-sort-value="0.98" | 980 m || 
|-id=096 bgcolor=#E9E9E9
| 266096 ||  || — || September 2, 1998 || Kitt Peak || Spacewatch || — || align=right | 1.0 km || 
|-id=097 bgcolor=#fefefe
| 266097 ||  || — || September 19, 2006 || Kitt Peak || Spacewatch || — || align=right data-sort-value="0.83" | 830 m || 
|-id=098 bgcolor=#fefefe
| 266098 ||  || — || September 19, 2006 || Antares || ARO || — || align=right data-sort-value="0.87" | 870 m || 
|-id=099 bgcolor=#fefefe
| 266099 ||  || — || September 18, 2006 || Kitt Peak || Spacewatch || MAS || align=right data-sort-value="0.83" | 830 m || 
|-id=100 bgcolor=#fefefe
| 266100 ||  || — || September 18, 2006 || Kitt Peak || Spacewatch || — || align=right data-sort-value="0.62" | 620 m || 
|}

266101–266200 

|-bgcolor=#fefefe
| 266101 ||  || — || September 21, 2006 || Anderson Mesa || LONEOS || — || align=right | 1.0 km || 
|-id=102 bgcolor=#fefefe
| 266102 ||  || — || September 20, 2006 || Anderson Mesa || LONEOS || — || align=right data-sort-value="0.97" | 970 m || 
|-id=103 bgcolor=#fefefe
| 266103 ||  || — || September 24, 2006 || Junk Bond || D. Healy || — || align=right data-sort-value="0.81" | 810 m || 
|-id=104 bgcolor=#fefefe
| 266104 ||  || — || September 16, 2006 || Catalina || CSS || ERI || align=right | 2.3 km || 
|-id=105 bgcolor=#fefefe
| 266105 ||  || — || September 24, 2006 || Kitt Peak || Spacewatch || — || align=right data-sort-value="0.85" | 850 m || 
|-id=106 bgcolor=#fefefe
| 266106 ||  || — || September 25, 2006 || Mount Lemmon || Mount Lemmon Survey || MAS || align=right data-sort-value="0.88" | 880 m || 
|-id=107 bgcolor=#fefefe
| 266107 ||  || — || September 25, 2006 || Kitt Peak || Spacewatch || NYS || align=right data-sort-value="0.74" | 740 m || 
|-id=108 bgcolor=#fefefe
| 266108 ||  || — || September 26, 2006 || Goodricke-Pigott || R. A. Tucker || — || align=right | 1.2 km || 
|-id=109 bgcolor=#fefefe
| 266109 ||  || — || September 26, 2006 || Socorro || LINEAR || NYS || align=right data-sort-value="0.83" | 830 m || 
|-id=110 bgcolor=#fefefe
| 266110 ||  || — || September 26, 2006 || Kitt Peak || Spacewatch || — || align=right data-sort-value="0.78" | 780 m || 
|-id=111 bgcolor=#E9E9E9
| 266111 ||  || — || September 27, 2006 || Mount Lemmon || Mount Lemmon Survey || — || align=right | 1.2 km || 
|-id=112 bgcolor=#fefefe
| 266112 ||  || — || September 27, 2006 || Mount Lemmon || Mount Lemmon Survey || — || align=right | 1.4 km || 
|-id=113 bgcolor=#fefefe
| 266113 ||  || — || September 27, 2006 || Mount Lemmon || Mount Lemmon Survey || — || align=right data-sort-value="0.86" | 860 m || 
|-id=114 bgcolor=#fefefe
| 266114 ||  || — || September 18, 2006 || Catalina || CSS || — || align=right data-sort-value="0.90" | 900 m || 
|-id=115 bgcolor=#fefefe
| 266115 ||  || — || September 27, 2006 || Mount Lemmon || Mount Lemmon Survey || — || align=right data-sort-value="0.84" | 840 m || 
|-id=116 bgcolor=#fefefe
| 266116 ||  || — || September 27, 2006 || Kitt Peak || Spacewatch || NYS || align=right data-sort-value="0.80" | 800 m || 
|-id=117 bgcolor=#fefefe
| 266117 ||  || — || September 27, 2006 || Kitt Peak || Spacewatch || — || align=right | 1.0 km || 
|-id=118 bgcolor=#fefefe
| 266118 ||  || — || September 28, 2006 || Mount Lemmon || Mount Lemmon Survey || NYS || align=right data-sort-value="0.78" | 780 m || 
|-id=119 bgcolor=#fefefe
| 266119 ||  || — || September 28, 2006 || Kitt Peak || Spacewatch || — || align=right data-sort-value="0.79" | 790 m || 
|-id=120 bgcolor=#fefefe
| 266120 ||  || — || September 28, 2006 || Kitt Peak || Spacewatch || — || align=right data-sort-value="0.93" | 930 m || 
|-id=121 bgcolor=#fefefe
| 266121 ||  || — || September 30, 2006 || Catalina || CSS || — || align=right data-sort-value="0.82" | 820 m || 
|-id=122 bgcolor=#fefefe
| 266122 ||  || — || September 18, 2006 || Catalina || CSS || FLO || align=right data-sort-value="0.89" | 890 m || 
|-id=123 bgcolor=#fefefe
| 266123 ||  || — || September 26, 2006 || Catalina || CSS || — || align=right | 1.1 km || 
|-id=124 bgcolor=#fefefe
| 266124 ||  || — || September 20, 2006 || Catalina || CSS || — || align=right | 1.8 km || 
|-id=125 bgcolor=#fefefe
| 266125 ||  || — || October 10, 2006 || Palomar || NEAT || NYS || align=right data-sort-value="0.61" | 610 m || 
|-id=126 bgcolor=#fefefe
| 266126 ||  || — || October 11, 2006 || Kitt Peak || Spacewatch || — || align=right data-sort-value="0.87" | 870 m || 
|-id=127 bgcolor=#fefefe
| 266127 ||  || — || October 11, 2006 || Kitt Peak || Spacewatch || NYS || align=right data-sort-value="0.67" | 670 m || 
|-id=128 bgcolor=#fefefe
| 266128 ||  || — || October 12, 2006 || Kitt Peak || Spacewatch || fast? || align=right data-sort-value="0.89" | 890 m || 
|-id=129 bgcolor=#fefefe
| 266129 ||  || — || October 12, 2006 || Kitt Peak || Spacewatch || — || align=right | 1.3 km || 
|-id=130 bgcolor=#fefefe
| 266130 ||  || — || October 12, 2006 || Kitt Peak || Spacewatch || — || align=right | 1.0 km || 
|-id=131 bgcolor=#fefefe
| 266131 ||  || — || October 12, 2006 || Kitt Peak || Spacewatch || — || align=right data-sort-value="0.89" | 890 m || 
|-id=132 bgcolor=#fefefe
| 266132 ||  || — || October 12, 2006 || Kitt Peak || Spacewatch || — || align=right data-sort-value="0.87" | 870 m || 
|-id=133 bgcolor=#fefefe
| 266133 ||  || — || October 12, 2006 || Palomar || NEAT || NYS || align=right data-sort-value="0.70" | 700 m || 
|-id=134 bgcolor=#fefefe
| 266134 ||  || — || October 15, 2006 || Catalina || CSS || NYS || align=right data-sort-value="0.85" | 850 m || 
|-id=135 bgcolor=#fefefe
| 266135 ||  || — || October 10, 2006 || Palomar || NEAT || PHO || align=right | 1.5 km || 
|-id=136 bgcolor=#fefefe
| 266136 ||  || — || October 10, 2006 || Palomar || NEAT || FLO || align=right data-sort-value="0.89" | 890 m || 
|-id=137 bgcolor=#fefefe
| 266137 ||  || — || October 11, 2006 || Palomar || NEAT || NYS || align=right data-sort-value="0.74" | 740 m || 
|-id=138 bgcolor=#fefefe
| 266138 ||  || — || October 11, 2006 || Palomar || NEAT || — || align=right data-sort-value="0.84" | 840 m || 
|-id=139 bgcolor=#fefefe
| 266139 ||  || — || October 13, 2006 || Kitt Peak || Spacewatch || — || align=right | 1.1 km || 
|-id=140 bgcolor=#fefefe
| 266140 ||  || — || October 13, 2006 || Kitt Peak || Spacewatch || — || align=right data-sort-value="0.87" | 870 m || 
|-id=141 bgcolor=#fefefe
| 266141 ||  || — || October 13, 2006 || Kitt Peak || Spacewatch || — || align=right data-sort-value="0.98" | 980 m || 
|-id=142 bgcolor=#fefefe
| 266142 ||  || — || October 13, 2006 || Kitt Peak || Spacewatch || — || align=right data-sort-value="0.83" | 830 m || 
|-id=143 bgcolor=#fefefe
| 266143 ||  || — || October 15, 2006 || Kitt Peak || Spacewatch || — || align=right data-sort-value="0.62" | 620 m || 
|-id=144 bgcolor=#fefefe
| 266144 ||  || — || October 15, 2006 || Kitt Peak || Spacewatch || NYS || align=right data-sort-value="0.74" | 740 m || 
|-id=145 bgcolor=#fefefe
| 266145 ||  || — || October 12, 2006 || Kitt Peak || Spacewatch || NYS || align=right data-sort-value="0.72" | 720 m || 
|-id=146 bgcolor=#fefefe
| 266146 ||  || — || October 17, 2006 || Mount Lemmon || Mount Lemmon Survey || NYS || align=right data-sort-value="0.82" | 820 m || 
|-id=147 bgcolor=#fefefe
| 266147 ||  || — || October 16, 2006 || Kitt Peak || Spacewatch || — || align=right data-sort-value="0.88" | 880 m || 
|-id=148 bgcolor=#fefefe
| 266148 ||  || — || October 16, 2006 || Kitt Peak || Spacewatch || — || align=right data-sort-value="0.75" | 750 m || 
|-id=149 bgcolor=#fefefe
| 266149 ||  || — || October 16, 2006 || Kitt Peak || Spacewatch || — || align=right data-sort-value="0.76" | 760 m || 
|-id=150 bgcolor=#fefefe
| 266150 ||  || — || October 16, 2006 || Catalina || CSS || NYS || align=right data-sort-value="0.87" | 870 m || 
|-id=151 bgcolor=#fefefe
| 266151 ||  || — || October 16, 2006 || Kitt Peak || Spacewatch || — || align=right data-sort-value="0.78" | 780 m || 
|-id=152 bgcolor=#fefefe
| 266152 ||  || — || October 19, 2006 || Kitt Peak || Spacewatch || — || align=right data-sort-value="0.71" | 710 m || 
|-id=153 bgcolor=#fefefe
| 266153 ||  || — || October 16, 2006 || Catalina || CSS || FLO || align=right data-sort-value="0.97" | 970 m || 
|-id=154 bgcolor=#fefefe
| 266154 ||  || — || October 16, 2006 || Catalina || CSS || — || align=right | 1.0 km || 
|-id=155 bgcolor=#fefefe
| 266155 ||  || — || October 16, 2006 || Catalina || CSS || V || align=right data-sort-value="0.85" | 850 m || 
|-id=156 bgcolor=#fefefe
| 266156 ||  || — || October 17, 2006 || Mount Lemmon || Mount Lemmon Survey || MAS || align=right data-sort-value="0.93" | 930 m || 
|-id=157 bgcolor=#d6d6d6
| 266157 ||  || — || October 17, 2006 || Kitt Peak || Spacewatch || — || align=right | 2.8 km || 
|-id=158 bgcolor=#fefefe
| 266158 ||  || — || October 18, 2006 || Kitt Peak || Spacewatch || — || align=right data-sort-value="0.90" | 900 m || 
|-id=159 bgcolor=#fefefe
| 266159 ||  || — || October 18, 2006 || Kitt Peak || Spacewatch || ERI || align=right | 1.5 km || 
|-id=160 bgcolor=#fefefe
| 266160 ||  || — || October 19, 2006 || Kitt Peak || Spacewatch || V || align=right data-sort-value="0.81" | 810 m || 
|-id=161 bgcolor=#fefefe
| 266161 ||  || — || October 19, 2006 || Kitt Peak || Spacewatch || — || align=right data-sort-value="0.97" | 970 m || 
|-id=162 bgcolor=#fefefe
| 266162 ||  || — || October 19, 2006 || Kitt Peak || Spacewatch || — || align=right data-sort-value="0.77" | 770 m || 
|-id=163 bgcolor=#fefefe
| 266163 ||  || — || October 21, 2006 || Catalina || CSS || NYS || align=right data-sort-value="0.80" | 800 m || 
|-id=164 bgcolor=#fefefe
| 266164 ||  || — || October 21, 2006 || Mount Lemmon || Mount Lemmon Survey || — || align=right data-sort-value="0.79" | 790 m || 
|-id=165 bgcolor=#fefefe
| 266165 ||  || — || October 21, 2006 || Kitt Peak || Spacewatch || — || align=right | 1.1 km || 
|-id=166 bgcolor=#fefefe
| 266166 ||  || — || October 28, 2006 || Mount Lemmon || Mount Lemmon Survey || — || align=right data-sort-value="0.90" | 900 m || 
|-id=167 bgcolor=#fefefe
| 266167 ||  || — || October 16, 2006 || Kitt Peak || Spacewatch || V || align=right data-sort-value="0.76" | 760 m || 
|-id=168 bgcolor=#fefefe
| 266168 ||  || — || October 19, 2006 || Mount Lemmon || Mount Lemmon Survey || — || align=right data-sort-value="0.80" | 800 m || 
|-id=169 bgcolor=#fefefe
| 266169 ||  || — || October 19, 2006 || Palomar || NEAT || — || align=right | 1.1 km || 
|-id=170 bgcolor=#fefefe
| 266170 ||  || — || October 27, 2006 || Catalina || CSS || ERI || align=right | 2.2 km || 
|-id=171 bgcolor=#fefefe
| 266171 ||  || — || October 27, 2006 || Mount Lemmon || Mount Lemmon Survey || V || align=right data-sort-value="0.75" | 750 m || 
|-id=172 bgcolor=#fefefe
| 266172 ||  || — || October 27, 2006 || Catalina || CSS || V || align=right data-sort-value="0.81" | 810 m || 
|-id=173 bgcolor=#fefefe
| 266173 ||  || — || October 27, 2006 || Kitt Peak || Spacewatch || — || align=right | 1.0 km || 
|-id=174 bgcolor=#fefefe
| 266174 ||  || — || October 28, 2006 || Kitt Peak || Spacewatch || — || align=right data-sort-value="0.99" | 990 m || 
|-id=175 bgcolor=#fefefe
| 266175 ||  || — || October 28, 2006 || Mount Lemmon || Mount Lemmon Survey || EUT || align=right data-sort-value="0.76" | 760 m || 
|-id=176 bgcolor=#fefefe
| 266176 ||  || — || October 21, 2006 || Mount Lemmon || Mount Lemmon Survey || — || align=right data-sort-value="0.86" | 860 m || 
|-id=177 bgcolor=#fefefe
| 266177 ||  || — || November 9, 2006 || Kitt Peak || Spacewatch || — || align=right data-sort-value="0.78" | 780 m || 
|-id=178 bgcolor=#fefefe
| 266178 ||  || — || November 9, 2006 || Kitt Peak || Spacewatch || FLO || align=right data-sort-value="0.72" | 720 m || 
|-id=179 bgcolor=#fefefe
| 266179 ||  || — || November 11, 2006 || Mount Lemmon || Mount Lemmon Survey || — || align=right data-sort-value="0.91" | 910 m || 
|-id=180 bgcolor=#fefefe
| 266180 ||  || — || November 13, 2006 || Kitt Peak || Spacewatch || V || align=right data-sort-value="0.81" | 810 m || 
|-id=181 bgcolor=#fefefe
| 266181 ||  || — || November 9, 2006 || Kitt Peak || Spacewatch || FLO || align=right data-sort-value="0.83" | 830 m || 
|-id=182 bgcolor=#fefefe
| 266182 ||  || — || November 11, 2006 || Kitt Peak || Spacewatch || — || align=right | 1.1 km || 
|-id=183 bgcolor=#fefefe
| 266183 ||  || — || November 11, 2006 || Kitt Peak || Spacewatch || NYS || align=right data-sort-value="0.98" | 980 m || 
|-id=184 bgcolor=#fefefe
| 266184 ||  || — || November 14, 2006 || Socorro || LINEAR || V || align=right data-sort-value="0.82" | 820 m || 
|-id=185 bgcolor=#fefefe
| 266185 ||  || — || November 11, 2006 || Catalina || CSS || — || align=right | 1.1 km || 
|-id=186 bgcolor=#fefefe
| 266186 ||  || — || November 11, 2006 || Palomar || NEAT || NYS || align=right data-sort-value="0.77" | 770 m || 
|-id=187 bgcolor=#fefefe
| 266187 ||  || — || November 12, 2006 || Lulin Observatory || H.-C. Lin, Q.-z. Ye || NYS || align=right data-sort-value="0.70" | 700 m || 
|-id=188 bgcolor=#fefefe
| 266188 ||  || — || November 12, 2006 || Lulin || H.-C. Lin, Q.-z. Ye || — || align=right data-sort-value="0.81" | 810 m || 
|-id=189 bgcolor=#fefefe
| 266189 ||  || — || November 13, 2006 || Catalina || CSS || — || align=right | 1.1 km || 
|-id=190 bgcolor=#fefefe
| 266190 ||  || — || November 13, 2006 || Catalina || CSS || V || align=right data-sort-value="0.87" | 870 m || 
|-id=191 bgcolor=#fefefe
| 266191 ||  || — || November 13, 2006 || Catalina || CSS || FLO || align=right data-sort-value="0.81" | 810 m || 
|-id=192 bgcolor=#fefefe
| 266192 ||  || — || November 13, 2006 || Palomar || NEAT || — || align=right data-sort-value="0.79" | 790 m || 
|-id=193 bgcolor=#E9E9E9
| 266193 ||  || — || November 15, 2006 || Kitt Peak || Spacewatch || — || align=right | 1.4 km || 
|-id=194 bgcolor=#fefefe
| 266194 ||  || — || November 15, 2006 || Kitt Peak || Spacewatch || V || align=right data-sort-value="0.81" | 810 m || 
|-id=195 bgcolor=#fefefe
| 266195 ||  || — || November 15, 2006 || Socorro || LINEAR || ERI || align=right | 2.2 km || 
|-id=196 bgcolor=#fefefe
| 266196 ||  || — || November 9, 2006 || Palomar || NEAT || MAS || align=right data-sort-value="0.64" | 640 m || 
|-id=197 bgcolor=#E9E9E9
| 266197 ||  || — || November 11, 2006 || Kitt Peak || Spacewatch || — || align=right | 1.1 km || 
|-id=198 bgcolor=#fefefe
| 266198 ||  || — || November 15, 2006 || Mount Lemmon || Mount Lemmon Survey || — || align=right data-sort-value="0.89" | 890 m || 
|-id=199 bgcolor=#fefefe
| 266199 ||  || — || November 17, 2006 || Jarnac || Jarnac Obs. || — || align=right | 2.0 km || 
|-id=200 bgcolor=#E9E9E9
| 266200 ||  || — || November 16, 2006 || Kitt Peak || Spacewatch || — || align=right | 1.5 km || 
|}

266201–266300 

|-bgcolor=#fefefe
| 266201 ||  || — || November 17, 2006 || Mount Lemmon || Mount Lemmon Survey || FLO || align=right data-sort-value="0.61" | 610 m || 
|-id=202 bgcolor=#fefefe
| 266202 ||  || — || November 17, 2006 || Mount Lemmon || Mount Lemmon Survey || — || align=right data-sort-value="0.88" | 880 m || 
|-id=203 bgcolor=#fefefe
| 266203 ||  || — || November 22, 2006 || 7300 Observatory || W. K. Y. Yeung || — || align=right data-sort-value="0.94" | 940 m || 
|-id=204 bgcolor=#E9E9E9
| 266204 ||  || — || November 16, 2006 || Kitt Peak || Spacewatch || — || align=right | 1.9 km || 
|-id=205 bgcolor=#fefefe
| 266205 ||  || — || November 17, 2006 || Kitt Peak || Spacewatch || FLO || align=right data-sort-value="0.74" | 740 m || 
|-id=206 bgcolor=#E9E9E9
| 266206 ||  || — || November 17, 2006 || Mount Lemmon || Mount Lemmon Survey || — || align=right | 1.3 km || 
|-id=207 bgcolor=#fefefe
| 266207 ||  || — || November 18, 2006 || Socorro || LINEAR || — || align=right | 3.4 km || 
|-id=208 bgcolor=#fefefe
| 266208 ||  || — || November 19, 2006 || Kitt Peak || Spacewatch || NYS || align=right data-sort-value="0.73" | 730 m || 
|-id=209 bgcolor=#fefefe
| 266209 ||  || — || November 19, 2006 || Kitt Peak || Spacewatch || — || align=right | 1.5 km || 
|-id=210 bgcolor=#fefefe
| 266210 ||  || — || November 19, 2006 || Kitt Peak || Spacewatch || — || align=right data-sort-value="0.97" | 970 m || 
|-id=211 bgcolor=#fefefe
| 266211 ||  || — || November 18, 2006 || Mount Lemmon || Mount Lemmon Survey || V || align=right data-sort-value="0.80" | 800 m || 
|-id=212 bgcolor=#fefefe
| 266212 ||  || — || November 20, 2006 || Kitt Peak || Spacewatch || NYS || align=right data-sort-value="0.64" | 640 m || 
|-id=213 bgcolor=#fefefe
| 266213 ||  || — || November 22, 2006 || Kitt Peak || Spacewatch || — || align=right | 1.0 km || 
|-id=214 bgcolor=#E9E9E9
| 266214 ||  || — || November 22, 2006 || Kitt Peak || Spacewatch || — || align=right | 3.3 km || 
|-id=215 bgcolor=#fefefe
| 266215 ||  || — || November 22, 2006 || Catalina || CSS || — || align=right | 1.2 km || 
|-id=216 bgcolor=#fefefe
| 266216 ||  || — || November 23, 2006 || Kitt Peak || Spacewatch || — || align=right data-sort-value="0.77" | 770 m || 
|-id=217 bgcolor=#fefefe
| 266217 ||  || — || November 27, 2006 || Mount Lemmon || Mount Lemmon Survey || SUL || align=right | 3.2 km || 
|-id=218 bgcolor=#E9E9E9
| 266218 ||  || — || November 24, 2006 || Mount Lemmon || Mount Lemmon Survey || — || align=right | 2.1 km || 
|-id=219 bgcolor=#E9E9E9
| 266219 ||  || — || November 30, 2006 || Kitt Peak || Spacewatch || — || align=right | 1.3 km || 
|-id=220 bgcolor=#fefefe
| 266220 ||  || — || November 20, 2006 || Kitt Peak || Spacewatch || V || align=right data-sort-value="0.79" | 790 m || 
|-id=221 bgcolor=#fefefe
| 266221 ||  || — || November 16, 2006 || Kitt Peak || Spacewatch || — || align=right | 1.1 km || 
|-id=222 bgcolor=#E9E9E9
| 266222 ||  || — || November 17, 2006 || Kitt Peak || Spacewatch || — || align=right | 1.8 km || 
|-id=223 bgcolor=#fefefe
| 266223 ||  || — || November 19, 2006 || Kitt Peak || Spacewatch || FLO || align=right data-sort-value="0.78" | 780 m || 
|-id=224 bgcolor=#E9E9E9
| 266224 ||  || — || November 21, 2006 || Mount Lemmon || Mount Lemmon Survey || — || align=right | 2.0 km || 
|-id=225 bgcolor=#E9E9E9
| 266225 ||  || — || November 27, 2006 || Mount Lemmon || Mount Lemmon Survey || — || align=right | 2.0 km || 
|-id=226 bgcolor=#E9E9E9
| 266226 ||  || — || November 19, 2006 || Kitt Peak || Spacewatch || — || align=right | 1.6 km || 
|-id=227 bgcolor=#E9E9E9
| 266227 || 2006 XR || — || December 9, 2006 || Pla D'Arguines || R. Ferrando || — || align=right | 1.6 km || 
|-id=228 bgcolor=#fefefe
| 266228 ||  || — || December 13, 2006 || 7300 || W. K. Y. Yeung || — || align=right | 1.0 km || 
|-id=229 bgcolor=#E9E9E9
| 266229 ||  || — || December 9, 2006 || Palomar || NEAT || EUN || align=right | 1.5 km || 
|-id=230 bgcolor=#fefefe
| 266230 ||  || — || December 10, 2006 || Kitt Peak || Spacewatch || MAS || align=right data-sort-value="0.93" | 930 m || 
|-id=231 bgcolor=#E9E9E9
| 266231 ||  || — || December 10, 2006 || Kitt Peak || Spacewatch || — || align=right | 1.7 km || 
|-id=232 bgcolor=#fefefe
| 266232 ||  || — || December 10, 2006 || Kitt Peak || Spacewatch || NYS || align=right data-sort-value="0.94" | 940 m || 
|-id=233 bgcolor=#fefefe
| 266233 ||  || — || December 11, 2006 || Kitt Peak || Spacewatch || MAS || align=right data-sort-value="0.89" | 890 m || 
|-id=234 bgcolor=#fefefe
| 266234 ||  || — || December 12, 2006 || Kitt Peak || Spacewatch || NYS || align=right data-sort-value="0.81" | 810 m || 
|-id=235 bgcolor=#E9E9E9
| 266235 ||  || — || December 12, 2006 || Kitt Peak || Spacewatch || — || align=right | 1.1 km || 
|-id=236 bgcolor=#fefefe
| 266236 ||  || — || December 12, 2006 || Mount Lemmon || Mount Lemmon Survey || MAS || align=right data-sort-value="0.91" | 910 m || 
|-id=237 bgcolor=#fefefe
| 266237 ||  || — || December 11, 2006 || Kitt Peak || Spacewatch || — || align=right | 1.2 km || 
|-id=238 bgcolor=#fefefe
| 266238 ||  || — || December 12, 2006 || Kitt Peak || Spacewatch || NYS || align=right data-sort-value="0.61" | 610 m || 
|-id=239 bgcolor=#fefefe
| 266239 ||  || — || December 12, 2006 || Kitt Peak || Spacewatch || NYS || align=right data-sort-value="0.99" | 990 m || 
|-id=240 bgcolor=#fefefe
| 266240 ||  || — || December 13, 2006 || Catalina || CSS || NYS || align=right | 1.1 km || 
|-id=241 bgcolor=#fefefe
| 266241 ||  || — || December 13, 2006 || Kitt Peak || Spacewatch || — || align=right | 1.3 km || 
|-id=242 bgcolor=#fefefe
| 266242 ||  || — || December 14, 2006 || Socorro || LINEAR || ERI || align=right | 1.8 km || 
|-id=243 bgcolor=#fefefe
| 266243 ||  || — || December 13, 2006 || Catalina || CSS || — || align=right | 1.3 km || 
|-id=244 bgcolor=#E9E9E9
| 266244 ||  || — || December 15, 2006 || Palomar || NEAT || — || align=right | 1.0 km || 
|-id=245 bgcolor=#E9E9E9
| 266245 ||  || — || December 9, 2006 || Kitt Peak || Spacewatch || — || align=right | 1.5 km || 
|-id=246 bgcolor=#fefefe
| 266246 ||  || — || December 13, 2006 || Kitt Peak || Spacewatch || — || align=right | 1.0 km || 
|-id=247 bgcolor=#fefefe
| 266247 ||  || — || December 13, 2006 || Mount Lemmon || Mount Lemmon Survey || — || align=right | 1.2 km || 
|-id=248 bgcolor=#E9E9E9
| 266248 ||  || — || December 15, 2006 || Mount Lemmon || Mount Lemmon Survey || — || align=right | 2.5 km || 
|-id=249 bgcolor=#fefefe
| 266249 ||  || — || December 16, 2006 || Kitt Peak || Spacewatch || MAS || align=right data-sort-value="0.82" | 820 m || 
|-id=250 bgcolor=#E9E9E9
| 266250 ||  || — || December 16, 2006 || Mount Lemmon || Mount Lemmon Survey || — || align=right | 1.2 km || 
|-id=251 bgcolor=#fefefe
| 266251 ||  || — || December 17, 2006 || 7300 || W. K. Y. Yeung || — || align=right | 1.1 km || 
|-id=252 bgcolor=#fefefe
| 266252 ||  || — || December 16, 2006 || Kitt Peak || Spacewatch || — || align=right | 1.6 km || 
|-id=253 bgcolor=#fefefe
| 266253 ||  || — || December 16, 2006 || Kitt Peak || Spacewatch || — || align=right | 1.4 km || 
|-id=254 bgcolor=#fefefe
| 266254 ||  || — || December 20, 2006 || Mount Lemmon || Mount Lemmon Survey || — || align=right | 1.4 km || 
|-id=255 bgcolor=#E9E9E9
| 266255 ||  || — || December 20, 2006 || Mount Lemmon || Mount Lemmon Survey || — || align=right | 1.6 km || 
|-id=256 bgcolor=#fefefe
| 266256 ||  || — || December 21, 2006 || Mount Lemmon || Mount Lemmon Survey || MAS || align=right data-sort-value="0.97" | 970 m || 
|-id=257 bgcolor=#E9E9E9
| 266257 ||  || — || December 24, 2006 || Catalina || CSS || — || align=right | 2.1 km || 
|-id=258 bgcolor=#fefefe
| 266258 ||  || — || December 24, 2006 || Kitt Peak || Spacewatch || — || align=right | 1.0 km || 
|-id=259 bgcolor=#fefefe
| 266259 ||  || — || December 21, 2006 || Kitt Peak || Spacewatch || — || align=right | 1.1 km || 
|-id=260 bgcolor=#E9E9E9
| 266260 ||  || — || December 21, 2006 || Kitt Peak || Spacewatch || — || align=right data-sort-value="0.90" | 900 m || 
|-id=261 bgcolor=#fefefe
| 266261 ||  || — || December 21, 2006 || Kitt Peak || Spacewatch || — || align=right | 1.1 km || 
|-id=262 bgcolor=#E9E9E9
| 266262 ||  || — || August 11, 2001 || Palomar || NEAT || — || align=right | 1.8 km || 
|-id=263 bgcolor=#fefefe
| 266263 ||  || — || December 24, 2006 || Kitt Peak || Spacewatch || CIM || align=right | 4.2 km || 
|-id=264 bgcolor=#fefefe
| 266264 ||  || — || December 22, 2006 || Socorro || LINEAR || V || align=right data-sort-value="0.89" | 890 m || 
|-id=265 bgcolor=#fefefe
| 266265 ||  || — || January 8, 2007 || Catalina || CSS || — || align=right | 1.5 km || 
|-id=266 bgcolor=#fefefe
| 266266 ||  || — || January 8, 2007 || Mount Lemmon || Mount Lemmon Survey || — || align=right data-sort-value="0.97" | 970 m || 
|-id=267 bgcolor=#E9E9E9
| 266267 ||  || — || January 8, 2007 || Mount Lemmon || Mount Lemmon Survey || EUN || align=right | 1.7 km || 
|-id=268 bgcolor=#fefefe
| 266268 ||  || — || January 10, 2007 || Mount Lemmon || Mount Lemmon Survey || SVE || align=right | 3.1 km || 
|-id=269 bgcolor=#fefefe
| 266269 ||  || — || January 9, 2007 || Mount Lemmon || Mount Lemmon Survey || MAS || align=right data-sort-value="0.93" | 930 m || 
|-id=270 bgcolor=#fefefe
| 266270 ||  || — || January 10, 2007 || Mount Lemmon || Mount Lemmon Survey || NYS || align=right data-sort-value="0.88" | 880 m || 
|-id=271 bgcolor=#E9E9E9
| 266271 ||  || — || January 10, 2007 || Kitt Peak || Spacewatch || — || align=right | 1.0 km || 
|-id=272 bgcolor=#E9E9E9
| 266272 ||  || — || January 10, 2007 || Mount Lemmon || Mount Lemmon Survey || — || align=right | 1.1 km || 
|-id=273 bgcolor=#fefefe
| 266273 ||  || — || January 15, 2007 || Catalina || CSS || — || align=right | 1.1 km || 
|-id=274 bgcolor=#fefefe
| 266274 ||  || — || January 10, 2007 || Socorro || LINEAR || NYS || align=right | 1.1 km || 
|-id=275 bgcolor=#fefefe
| 266275 ||  || — || January 10, 2007 || Catalina || CSS || — || align=right | 1.1 km || 
|-id=276 bgcolor=#fefefe
| 266276 ||  || — || January 10, 2007 || Mount Lemmon || Mount Lemmon Survey || NYS || align=right data-sort-value="0.81" | 810 m || 
|-id=277 bgcolor=#fefefe
| 266277 ||  || — || January 10, 2007 || Mount Lemmon || Mount Lemmon Survey || — || align=right | 1.0 km || 
|-id=278 bgcolor=#fefefe
| 266278 ||  || — || January 17, 2007 || Kitt Peak || Spacewatch || MAS || align=right data-sort-value="0.97" | 970 m || 
|-id=279 bgcolor=#fefefe
| 266279 ||  || — || January 16, 2007 || Socorro || LINEAR || — || align=right | 1.0 km || 
|-id=280 bgcolor=#E9E9E9
| 266280 ||  || — || January 16, 2007 || Socorro || LINEAR || — || align=right | 1.6 km || 
|-id=281 bgcolor=#fefefe
| 266281 ||  || — || January 17, 2007 || Palomar || NEAT || — || align=right | 1.5 km || 
|-id=282 bgcolor=#fefefe
| 266282 ||  || — || January 18, 2007 || Palomar || NEAT || NYS || align=right | 1.0 km || 
|-id=283 bgcolor=#E9E9E9
| 266283 ||  || — || January 17, 2007 || Palomar || NEAT || — || align=right | 1.1 km || 
|-id=284 bgcolor=#fefefe
| 266284 ||  || — || January 17, 2007 || Kitt Peak || Spacewatch || — || align=right | 1.1 km || 
|-id=285 bgcolor=#E9E9E9
| 266285 ||  || — || January 17, 2007 || Kitt Peak || Spacewatch || — || align=right | 1.7 km || 
|-id=286 bgcolor=#E9E9E9
| 266286 Bodenmüller ||  ||  || January 21, 2007 || Altschwendt || W. Ries || — || align=right | 1.3 km || 
|-id=287 bgcolor=#E9E9E9
| 266287 ||  || — || January 24, 2007 || Socorro || LINEAR || — || align=right | 2.2 km || 
|-id=288 bgcolor=#E9E9E9
| 266288 ||  || — || January 26, 2007 || Calvin-Rehoboth || L. A. Molnar || — || align=right | 1.1 km || 
|-id=289 bgcolor=#fefefe
| 266289 ||  || — || January 21, 2007 || Socorro || LINEAR || MAS || align=right | 1.1 km || 
|-id=290 bgcolor=#E9E9E9
| 266290 ||  || — || January 24, 2007 || Socorro || LINEAR || — || align=right | 1.6 km || 
|-id=291 bgcolor=#E9E9E9
| 266291 ||  || — || January 24, 2007 || Catalina || CSS || — || align=right | 1.1 km || 
|-id=292 bgcolor=#E9E9E9
| 266292 ||  || — || January 24, 2007 || Catalina || CSS || — || align=right | 2.2 km || 
|-id=293 bgcolor=#fefefe
| 266293 ||  || — || January 24, 2007 || Catalina || CSS || MAS || align=right | 1.3 km || 
|-id=294 bgcolor=#fefefe
| 266294 ||  || — || January 26, 2007 || Anderson Mesa || LONEOS || NYS || align=right data-sort-value="0.90" | 900 m || 
|-id=295 bgcolor=#E9E9E9
| 266295 ||  || — || January 26, 2007 || Kitt Peak || Spacewatch || — || align=right | 1.6 km || 
|-id=296 bgcolor=#E9E9E9
| 266296 ||  || — || January 24, 2007 || Kitt Peak || Spacewatch || — || align=right | 1.8 km || 
|-id=297 bgcolor=#E9E9E9
| 266297 ||  || — || January 27, 2007 || Mount Lemmon || Mount Lemmon Survey || — || align=right | 3.8 km || 
|-id=298 bgcolor=#E9E9E9
| 266298 ||  || — || January 27, 2007 || Kitt Peak || Spacewatch || AER || align=right | 1.4 km || 
|-id=299 bgcolor=#E9E9E9
| 266299 ||  || — || January 24, 2007 || Catalina || CSS || — || align=right | 1.1 km || 
|-id=300 bgcolor=#E9E9E9
| 266300 ||  || — || January 19, 2007 || Mauna Kea || Mauna Kea Obs. || — || align=right | 1.7 km || 
|}

266301–266400 

|-bgcolor=#E9E9E9
| 266301 ||  || — || January 16, 2007 || Catalina || CSS || ADE || align=right | 2.7 km || 
|-id=302 bgcolor=#E9E9E9
| 266302 ||  || — || February 6, 2007 || Mount Lemmon || Mount Lemmon Survey || — || align=right | 1.1 km || 
|-id=303 bgcolor=#E9E9E9
| 266303 ||  || — || February 7, 2007 || Kitt Peak || Spacewatch || — || align=right | 1.1 km || 
|-id=304 bgcolor=#E9E9E9
| 266304 ||  || — || February 6, 2007 || Kitt Peak || Spacewatch || — || align=right | 1.2 km || 
|-id=305 bgcolor=#E9E9E9
| 266305 ||  || — || February 6, 2007 || Palomar || NEAT || EUN || align=right | 1.5 km || 
|-id=306 bgcolor=#E9E9E9
| 266306 ||  || — || February 6, 2007 || Mount Lemmon || Mount Lemmon Survey || — || align=right | 1.2 km || 
|-id=307 bgcolor=#E9E9E9
| 266307 ||  || — || February 7, 2007 || Mount Lemmon || Mount Lemmon Survey || — || align=right | 1.2 km || 
|-id=308 bgcolor=#E9E9E9
| 266308 ||  || — || February 6, 2007 || Kitt Peak || Spacewatch || — || align=right | 1.0 km || 
|-id=309 bgcolor=#E9E9E9
| 266309 ||  || — || February 6, 2007 || Mount Lemmon || Mount Lemmon Survey || — || align=right | 1.7 km || 
|-id=310 bgcolor=#fefefe
| 266310 ||  || — || February 6, 2007 || Mount Lemmon || Mount Lemmon Survey || — || align=right data-sort-value="0.97" | 970 m || 
|-id=311 bgcolor=#fefefe
| 266311 ||  || — || February 6, 2007 || Mount Lemmon || Mount Lemmon Survey || NYS || align=right | 1.1 km || 
|-id=312 bgcolor=#E9E9E9
| 266312 ||  || — || February 6, 2007 || Kitt Peak || Spacewatch || ADEslow || align=right | 3.7 km || 
|-id=313 bgcolor=#E9E9E9
| 266313 ||  || — || February 7, 2007 || Kitt Peak || Spacewatch || — || align=right | 1.6 km || 
|-id=314 bgcolor=#E9E9E9
| 266314 ||  || — || February 8, 2007 || Palomar || NEAT || — || align=right | 1.6 km || 
|-id=315 bgcolor=#E9E9E9
| 266315 ||  || — || February 9, 2007 || Kitt Peak || Spacewatch || — || align=right | 2.3 km || 
|-id=316 bgcolor=#E9E9E9
| 266316 ||  || — || February 10, 2007 || Catalina || CSS || — || align=right | 1.5 km || 
|-id=317 bgcolor=#E9E9E9
| 266317 ||  || — || February 15, 2007 || Catalina || CSS || — || align=right | 1.1 km || 
|-id=318 bgcolor=#fefefe
| 266318 ||  || — || February 15, 2007 || Catalina || CSS || — || align=right | 1.2 km || 
|-id=319 bgcolor=#E9E9E9
| 266319 ||  || — || February 7, 2007 || Mount Lemmon || Mount Lemmon Survey || — || align=right | 2.6 km || 
|-id=320 bgcolor=#E9E9E9
| 266320 ||  || — || February 7, 2007 || Kitt Peak || Spacewatch || — || align=right | 2.3 km || 
|-id=321 bgcolor=#E9E9E9
| 266321 ||  || — || February 7, 2007 || Mount Lemmon || Mount Lemmon Survey || — || align=right | 3.2 km || 
|-id=322 bgcolor=#E9E9E9
| 266322 ||  || — || February 6, 2007 || Kitt Peak || Spacewatch || — || align=right | 1.2 km || 
|-id=323 bgcolor=#E9E9E9
| 266323 ||  || — || February 16, 2007 || Mount Lemmon || Mount Lemmon Survey || — || align=right | 1.6 km || 
|-id=324 bgcolor=#E9E9E9
| 266324 ||  || — || February 16, 2007 || Catalina || CSS || — || align=right | 1.8 km || 
|-id=325 bgcolor=#E9E9E9
| 266325 ||  || — || February 17, 2007 || Kitt Peak || Spacewatch || — || align=right | 2.1 km || 
|-id=326 bgcolor=#E9E9E9
| 266326 ||  || — || February 17, 2007 || Kitt Peak || Spacewatch || WIT || align=right | 1.3 km || 
|-id=327 bgcolor=#E9E9E9
| 266327 ||  || — || February 17, 2007 || Kitt Peak || Spacewatch || — || align=right | 1.9 km || 
|-id=328 bgcolor=#E9E9E9
| 266328 ||  || — || February 17, 2007 || Kitt Peak || Spacewatch || — || align=right | 1.5 km || 
|-id=329 bgcolor=#E9E9E9
| 266329 ||  || — || February 17, 2007 || Kitt Peak || Spacewatch || — || align=right | 1.7 km || 
|-id=330 bgcolor=#E9E9E9
| 266330 ||  || — || February 17, 2007 || Kitt Peak || Spacewatch || — || align=right | 1.2 km || 
|-id=331 bgcolor=#E9E9E9
| 266331 ||  || — || February 17, 2007 || Kitt Peak || Spacewatch || — || align=right | 1.2 km || 
|-id=332 bgcolor=#E9E9E9
| 266332 ||  || — || February 17, 2007 || Kitt Peak || Spacewatch || HEN || align=right | 1.3 km || 
|-id=333 bgcolor=#E9E9E9
| 266333 ||  || — || February 16, 2007 || Palomar || NEAT || — || align=right | 1.2 km || 
|-id=334 bgcolor=#E9E9E9
| 266334 ||  || — || February 21, 2007 || Socorro || LINEAR || — || align=right | 1.2 km || 
|-id=335 bgcolor=#E9E9E9
| 266335 ||  || — || February 22, 2007 || Kitt Peak || Spacewatch || JUN || align=right | 1.2 km || 
|-id=336 bgcolor=#E9E9E9
| 266336 ||  || — || February 22, 2007 || Anderson Mesa || LONEOS || — || align=right | 1.4 km || 
|-id=337 bgcolor=#E9E9E9
| 266337 ||  || — || February 23, 2007 || Mount Lemmon || Mount Lemmon Survey || — || align=right | 2.1 km || 
|-id=338 bgcolor=#E9E9E9
| 266338 ||  || — || February 21, 2007 || Kitt Peak || Spacewatch || — || align=right | 2.8 km || 
|-id=339 bgcolor=#d6d6d6
| 266339 ||  || — || February 21, 2007 || Kitt Peak || Spacewatch || KOR || align=right | 1.5 km || 
|-id=340 bgcolor=#E9E9E9
| 266340 ||  || — || February 23, 2007 || Kitt Peak || Spacewatch || — || align=right | 1.5 km || 
|-id=341 bgcolor=#E9E9E9
| 266341 ||  || — || February 23, 2007 || Mount Lemmon || Mount Lemmon Survey || — || align=right | 1.6 km || 
|-id=342 bgcolor=#E9E9E9
| 266342 ||  || — || February 23, 2007 || Mount Lemmon || Mount Lemmon Survey || — || align=right | 1.9 km || 
|-id=343 bgcolor=#E9E9E9
| 266343 ||  || — || February 23, 2007 || Mount Lemmon || Mount Lemmon Survey || — || align=right | 1.1 km || 
|-id=344 bgcolor=#fefefe
| 266344 ||  || — || February 23, 2007 || Kitt Peak || Spacewatch || — || align=right | 1.0 km || 
|-id=345 bgcolor=#E9E9E9
| 266345 ||  || — || February 23, 2007 || Kitt Peak || Spacewatch || GEF || align=right | 1.8 km || 
|-id=346 bgcolor=#E9E9E9
| 266346 ||  || — || February 23, 2007 || Kitt Peak || Spacewatch || — || align=right | 1.4 km || 
|-id=347 bgcolor=#d6d6d6
| 266347 ||  || — || February 26, 2007 || Mount Lemmon || Mount Lemmon Survey || KOR || align=right | 2.0 km || 
|-id=348 bgcolor=#E9E9E9
| 266348 ||  || — || February 24, 2007 || Nyukasa || Mount Nyukasa Stn. || — || align=right | 2.9 km || 
|-id=349 bgcolor=#fefefe
| 266349 ||  || — || February 17, 2007 || Palomar || NEAT || — || align=right | 3.6 km || 
|-id=350 bgcolor=#E9E9E9
| 266350 ||  || — || February 16, 2007 || Catalina || CSS || MAR || align=right | 1.6 km || 
|-id=351 bgcolor=#E9E9E9
| 266351 ||  || — || February 17, 2007 || Kitt Peak || Spacewatch || AEO || align=right | 1.6 km || 
|-id=352 bgcolor=#E9E9E9
| 266352 ||  || — || February 21, 2007 || Mount Lemmon || Mount Lemmon Survey || — || align=right | 1.2 km || 
|-id=353 bgcolor=#E9E9E9
| 266353 ||  || — || February 16, 2007 || Catalina || CSS || — || align=right | 2.4 km || 
|-id=354 bgcolor=#E9E9E9
| 266354 ||  || — || February 27, 2007 || Kitt Peak || Spacewatch || AGN || align=right | 1.2 km || 
|-id=355 bgcolor=#E9E9E9
| 266355 ||  || — || February 26, 2007 || Mount Lemmon || Mount Lemmon Survey || — || align=right | 1.7 km || 
|-id=356 bgcolor=#E9E9E9
| 266356 ||  || — || March 9, 2007 || Catalina || CSS || — || align=right | 2.6 km || 
|-id=357 bgcolor=#E9E9E9
| 266357 ||  || — || March 10, 2007 || Marly || P. Kocher || — || align=right | 2.3 km || 
|-id=358 bgcolor=#E9E9E9
| 266358 ||  || — || March 10, 2007 || Mount Lemmon || Mount Lemmon Survey || — || align=right | 2.3 km || 
|-id=359 bgcolor=#E9E9E9
| 266359 ||  || — || March 10, 2007 || Palomar || NEAT || RAF || align=right | 1.5 km || 
|-id=360 bgcolor=#E9E9E9
| 266360 ||  || — || March 11, 2007 || Kitt Peak || Spacewatch || — || align=right | 3.7 km || 
|-id=361 bgcolor=#E9E9E9
| 266361 ||  || — || March 9, 2007 || Kitt Peak || Spacewatch || WIT || align=right | 1.3 km || 
|-id=362 bgcolor=#E9E9E9
| 266362 ||  || — || March 9, 2007 || Kitt Peak || Spacewatch || — || align=right | 3.4 km || 
|-id=363 bgcolor=#E9E9E9
| 266363 ||  || — || March 9, 2007 || Kitt Peak || Spacewatch || — || align=right | 2.0 km || 
|-id=364 bgcolor=#E9E9E9
| 266364 ||  || — || March 11, 2007 || Mount Lemmon || Mount Lemmon Survey || — || align=right | 1.1 km || 
|-id=365 bgcolor=#E9E9E9
| 266365 ||  || — || March 12, 2007 || Mount Lemmon || Mount Lemmon Survey || — || align=right | 1.7 km || 
|-id=366 bgcolor=#E9E9E9
| 266366 ||  || — || March 10, 2007 || Kitt Peak || Spacewatch || — || align=right | 1.7 km || 
|-id=367 bgcolor=#E9E9E9
| 266367 ||  || — || March 10, 2007 || Mount Lemmon || Mount Lemmon Survey || — || align=right | 1.4 km || 
|-id=368 bgcolor=#d6d6d6
| 266368 ||  || — || March 10, 2007 || Kitt Peak || Spacewatch || KOR || align=right | 1.7 km || 
|-id=369 bgcolor=#E9E9E9
| 266369 ||  || — || March 10, 2007 || Mount Lemmon || Mount Lemmon Survey || — || align=right | 1.9 km || 
|-id=370 bgcolor=#E9E9E9
| 266370 ||  || — || March 10, 2007 || Mount Lemmon || Mount Lemmon Survey || — || align=right | 2.6 km || 
|-id=371 bgcolor=#E9E9E9
| 266371 ||  || — || March 10, 2007 || Mount Lemmon || Mount Lemmon Survey || — || align=right | 1.8 km || 
|-id=372 bgcolor=#E9E9E9
| 266372 ||  || — || March 11, 2007 || Kitt Peak || Spacewatch || — || align=right | 1.0 km || 
|-id=373 bgcolor=#E9E9E9
| 266373 ||  || — || March 12, 2007 || Kitt Peak || Spacewatch || ADE || align=right | 2.6 km || 
|-id=374 bgcolor=#E9E9E9
| 266374 ||  || — || March 10, 2007 || Palomar || NEAT || — || align=right | 1.9 km || 
|-id=375 bgcolor=#E9E9E9
| 266375 ||  || — || March 11, 2007 || Kitt Peak || Spacewatch || HEN || align=right | 1.2 km || 
|-id=376 bgcolor=#E9E9E9
| 266376 ||  || — || March 11, 2007 || Catalina || CSS || — || align=right | 1.7 km || 
|-id=377 bgcolor=#E9E9E9
| 266377 ||  || — || March 11, 2007 || Mount Lemmon || Mount Lemmon Survey || WIT || align=right | 1.6 km || 
|-id=378 bgcolor=#E9E9E9
| 266378 ||  || — || March 11, 2007 || Kitt Peak || Spacewatch || — || align=right | 2.7 km || 
|-id=379 bgcolor=#E9E9E9
| 266379 ||  || — || March 11, 2007 || Kitt Peak || Spacewatch || — || align=right | 3.0 km || 
|-id=380 bgcolor=#E9E9E9
| 266380 ||  || — || March 12, 2007 || Kitt Peak || Spacewatch || RAF || align=right data-sort-value="0.98" | 980 m || 
|-id=381 bgcolor=#d6d6d6
| 266381 ||  || — || March 13, 2007 || Mount Lemmon || Mount Lemmon Survey || — || align=right | 3.4 km || 
|-id=382 bgcolor=#d6d6d6
| 266382 ||  || — || March 13, 2007 || Mount Lemmon || Mount Lemmon Survey || CHA || align=right | 2.5 km || 
|-id=383 bgcolor=#E9E9E9
| 266383 ||  || — || March 13, 2007 || Mount Lemmon || Mount Lemmon Survey || — || align=right | 1.8 km || 
|-id=384 bgcolor=#E9E9E9
| 266384 ||  || — || March 14, 2007 || Mount Lemmon || Mount Lemmon Survey || MAR || align=right | 3.5 km || 
|-id=385 bgcolor=#E9E9E9
| 266385 ||  || — || March 14, 2007 || Catalina || CSS || JUN || align=right | 1.5 km || 
|-id=386 bgcolor=#E9E9E9
| 266386 ||  || — || March 9, 2007 || Mount Lemmon || Mount Lemmon Survey || — || align=right | 1.5 km || 
|-id=387 bgcolor=#E9E9E9
| 266387 ||  || — || March 9, 2007 || Mount Lemmon || Mount Lemmon Survey || — || align=right | 1.5 km || 
|-id=388 bgcolor=#E9E9E9
| 266388 ||  || — || March 9, 2007 || Mount Lemmon || Mount Lemmon Survey || — || align=right | 3.0 km || 
|-id=389 bgcolor=#E9E9E9
| 266389 ||  || — || March 10, 2007 || Mount Lemmon || Mount Lemmon Survey || HEN || align=right | 1.4 km || 
|-id=390 bgcolor=#E9E9E9
| 266390 ||  || — || March 12, 2007 || Kitt Peak || Spacewatch || — || align=right | 2.7 km || 
|-id=391 bgcolor=#d6d6d6
| 266391 ||  || — || March 12, 2007 || Kitt Peak || Spacewatch || — || align=right | 3.1 km || 
|-id=392 bgcolor=#E9E9E9
| 266392 ||  || — || March 12, 2007 || Mount Lemmon || Mount Lemmon Survey || — || align=right | 2.9 km || 
|-id=393 bgcolor=#E9E9E9
| 266393 ||  || — || March 12, 2007 || Mount Lemmon || Mount Lemmon Survey || HOF || align=right | 3.1 km || 
|-id=394 bgcolor=#E9E9E9
| 266394 ||  || — || March 12, 2007 || Kitt Peak || Spacewatch || — || align=right | 2.5 km || 
|-id=395 bgcolor=#E9E9E9
| 266395 ||  || — || March 13, 2007 || Kitt Peak || Spacewatch || — || align=right | 2.9 km || 
|-id=396 bgcolor=#E9E9E9
| 266396 ||  || — || March 15, 2007 || Kitt Peak || Spacewatch || — || align=right | 2.1 km || 
|-id=397 bgcolor=#E9E9E9
| 266397 ||  || — || March 11, 2007 || Calvin-Rehoboth || Calvin–Rehoboth Obs. || — || align=right | 1.0 km || 
|-id=398 bgcolor=#E9E9E9
| 266398 ||  || — || March 12, 2007 || Mount Lemmon || Mount Lemmon Survey || — || align=right | 1.6 km || 
|-id=399 bgcolor=#E9E9E9
| 266399 ||  || — || March 15, 2007 || Mount Lemmon || Mount Lemmon Survey || — || align=right | 2.8 km || 
|-id=400 bgcolor=#E9E9E9
| 266400 ||  || — || March 15, 2007 || Catalina || CSS || — || align=right | 1.7 km || 
|}

266401–266500 

|-bgcolor=#E9E9E9
| 266401 ||  || — || March 14, 2007 || Mount Lemmon || Mount Lemmon Survey || — || align=right | 2.4 km || 
|-id=402 bgcolor=#d6d6d6
| 266402 ||  || — || March 11, 2007 || Kitt Peak || Spacewatch || — || align=right | 3.5 km || 
|-id=403 bgcolor=#E9E9E9
| 266403 ||  || — || March 8, 2007 || Palomar || NEAT || — || align=right | 2.1 km || 
|-id=404 bgcolor=#d6d6d6
| 266404 ||  || — || March 13, 2007 || Kitt Peak || Spacewatch || — || align=right | 4.0 km || 
|-id=405 bgcolor=#d6d6d6
| 266405 ||  || — || March 10, 2007 || Palomar || NEAT || HYG || align=right | 4.5 km || 
|-id=406 bgcolor=#E9E9E9
| 266406 ||  || — || March 16, 2007 || Catalina || CSS || — || align=right | 2.3 km || 
|-id=407 bgcolor=#E9E9E9
| 266407 ||  || — || March 16, 2007 || Kitt Peak || Spacewatch || AGN || align=right | 1.6 km || 
|-id=408 bgcolor=#E9E9E9
| 266408 ||  || — || March 20, 2007 || Mount Lemmon || Mount Lemmon Survey || — || align=right data-sort-value="0.86" | 860 m || 
|-id=409 bgcolor=#E9E9E9
| 266409 ||  || — || March 20, 2007 || Mount Lemmon || Mount Lemmon Survey || — || align=right | 2.9 km || 
|-id=410 bgcolor=#E9E9E9
| 266410 ||  || — || March 20, 2007 || Kitt Peak || Spacewatch || WIT || align=right | 1.4 km || 
|-id=411 bgcolor=#E9E9E9
| 266411 ||  || — || March 20, 2007 || Mount Lemmon || Mount Lemmon Survey || — || align=right | 1.2 km || 
|-id=412 bgcolor=#E9E9E9
| 266412 ||  || — || March 20, 2007 || Mount Lemmon || Mount Lemmon Survey || — || align=right | 2.2 km || 
|-id=413 bgcolor=#E9E9E9
| 266413 ||  || — || March 20, 2007 || Mount Lemmon || Mount Lemmon Survey || — || align=right | 1.8 km || 
|-id=414 bgcolor=#E9E9E9
| 266414 ||  || — || March 27, 2007 || Siding Spring || SSS || ADE || align=right | 4.7 km || 
|-id=415 bgcolor=#E9E9E9
| 266415 ||  || — || March 27, 2007 || Siding Spring || SSS || — || align=right | 2.7 km || 
|-id=416 bgcolor=#E9E9E9
| 266416 ||  || — || March 30, 2007 || Palomar || NEAT || JUN || align=right | 2.1 km || 
|-id=417 bgcolor=#E9E9E9
| 266417 ||  || — || March 16, 2007 || Mount Lemmon || Mount Lemmon Survey || — || align=right data-sort-value="0.96" | 960 m || 
|-id=418 bgcolor=#E9E9E9
| 266418 ||  || — || April 8, 2007 || Palomar || NEAT || — || align=right | 3.9 km || 
|-id=419 bgcolor=#E9E9E9
| 266419 ||  || — || April 9, 2007 || Bergisch Gladbach || W. Bickel || HOF || align=right | 3.6 km || 
|-id=420 bgcolor=#E9E9E9
| 266420 ||  || — || April 11, 2007 || Kitt Peak || Spacewatch || EUN || align=right | 1.6 km || 
|-id=421 bgcolor=#d6d6d6
| 266421 ||  || — || April 11, 2007 || Kitt Peak || Spacewatch || EOS || align=right | 3.6 km || 
|-id=422 bgcolor=#E9E9E9
| 266422 ||  || — || April 11, 2007 || Catalina || CSS || — || align=right | 2.0 km || 
|-id=423 bgcolor=#d6d6d6
| 266423 ||  || — || April 11, 2007 || Mount Lemmon || Mount Lemmon Survey || — || align=right | 2.6 km || 
|-id=424 bgcolor=#E9E9E9
| 266424 ||  || — || April 14, 2007 || Kitt Peak || Spacewatch || — || align=right | 3.0 km || 
|-id=425 bgcolor=#E9E9E9
| 266425 ||  || — || April 14, 2007 || Mount Lemmon || Mount Lemmon Survey || — || align=right | 2.5 km || 
|-id=426 bgcolor=#d6d6d6
| 266426 ||  || — || April 14, 2007 || Kitt Peak || Spacewatch || KOR || align=right | 1.6 km || 
|-id=427 bgcolor=#d6d6d6
| 266427 ||  || — || April 11, 2007 || Catalina || CSS || — || align=right | 4.3 km || 
|-id=428 bgcolor=#E9E9E9
| 266428 ||  || — || April 14, 2007 || Kitt Peak || Spacewatch || AGN || align=right | 1.5 km || 
|-id=429 bgcolor=#E9E9E9
| 266429 ||  || — || April 15, 2007 || Mount Lemmon || Mount Lemmon Survey || WIT || align=right | 1.3 km || 
|-id=430 bgcolor=#d6d6d6
| 266430 ||  || — || April 15, 2007 || Kitt Peak || Spacewatch || K-2 || align=right | 1.7 km || 
|-id=431 bgcolor=#d6d6d6
| 266431 ||  || — || April 15, 2007 || Kitt Peak || Spacewatch || — || align=right | 3.5 km || 
|-id=432 bgcolor=#d6d6d6
| 266432 ||  || — || April 15, 2007 || Mount Lemmon || Mount Lemmon Survey || — || align=right | 3.2 km || 
|-id=433 bgcolor=#d6d6d6
| 266433 ||  || — || April 15, 2007 || Catalina || CSS || EUP || align=right | 4.6 km || 
|-id=434 bgcolor=#E9E9E9
| 266434 ||  || — || April 15, 2007 || Kitt Peak || Spacewatch || — || align=right | 4.2 km || 
|-id=435 bgcolor=#E9E9E9
| 266435 ||  || — || April 16, 2007 || Catalina || CSS || XIZ || align=right | 1.7 km || 
|-id=436 bgcolor=#d6d6d6
| 266436 ||  || — || April 16, 2007 || Anderson Mesa || LONEOS || — || align=right | 3.9 km || 
|-id=437 bgcolor=#E9E9E9
| 266437 ||  || — || April 16, 2007 || Catalina || CSS || EUN || align=right | 2.6 km || 
|-id=438 bgcolor=#E9E9E9
| 266438 ||  || — || April 18, 2007 || Kitt Peak || Spacewatch || WIT || align=right | 1.4 km || 
|-id=439 bgcolor=#d6d6d6
| 266439 ||  || — || April 18, 2007 || Kitt Peak || Spacewatch || — || align=right | 4.1 km || 
|-id=440 bgcolor=#d6d6d6
| 266440 ||  || — || April 19, 2007 || Kitt Peak || Spacewatch || — || align=right | 2.8 km || 
|-id=441 bgcolor=#d6d6d6
| 266441 ||  || — || April 20, 2007 || Kitt Peak || Spacewatch || HYG || align=right | 3.8 km || 
|-id=442 bgcolor=#d6d6d6
| 266442 ||  || — || April 22, 2007 || Mount Lemmon || Mount Lemmon Survey || HYG || align=right | 3.1 km || 
|-id=443 bgcolor=#E9E9E9
| 266443 ||  || — || April 19, 2007 || Mount Lemmon || Mount Lemmon Survey || — || align=right | 2.9 km || 
|-id=444 bgcolor=#d6d6d6
| 266444 ||  || — || April 25, 2007 || Mount Lemmon || Mount Lemmon Survey || — || align=right | 2.9 km || 
|-id=445 bgcolor=#E9E9E9
| 266445 ||  || — || April 21, 2007 || Lulin Observatory || LUSS || — || align=right | 3.1 km || 
|-id=446 bgcolor=#E9E9E9
| 266446 ||  || — || April 24, 2007 || Kitt Peak || Spacewatch || — || align=right | 2.7 km || 
|-id=447 bgcolor=#E9E9E9
| 266447 ||  || — || April 26, 2007 || Mount Lemmon || Mount Lemmon Survey || — || align=right | 2.0 km || 
|-id=448 bgcolor=#E9E9E9
| 266448 ||  || — || April 23, 2007 || Mount Lemmon || Mount Lemmon Survey || HEN || align=right | 1.3 km || 
|-id=449 bgcolor=#E9E9E9
| 266449 ||  || — || May 7, 2007 || Kitt Peak || Spacewatch || — || align=right | 3.4 km || 
|-id=450 bgcolor=#d6d6d6
| 266450 ||  || — || May 7, 2007 || Mount Lemmon || Mount Lemmon Survey || — || align=right | 4.6 km || 
|-id=451 bgcolor=#d6d6d6
| 266451 ||  || — || May 10, 2007 || Kitt Peak || Spacewatch || — || align=right | 3.8 km || 
|-id=452 bgcolor=#d6d6d6
| 266452 ||  || — || May 9, 2007 || Kitt Peak || Spacewatch || EOS || align=right | 5.0 km || 
|-id=453 bgcolor=#d6d6d6
| 266453 ||  || — || May 11, 2007 || Catalina || CSS || — || align=right | 3.9 km || 
|-id=454 bgcolor=#d6d6d6
| 266454 ||  || — || May 12, 2007 || Mount Lemmon || Mount Lemmon Survey || — || align=right | 4.5 km || 
|-id=455 bgcolor=#d6d6d6
| 266455 ||  || — || May 9, 2007 || Mount Lemmon || Mount Lemmon Survey || — || align=right | 7.3 km || 
|-id=456 bgcolor=#d6d6d6
| 266456 ||  || — || May 21, 2007 || Tiki || S. F. Hönig, N. Teamo || — || align=right | 3.6 km || 
|-id=457 bgcolor=#E9E9E9
| 266457 ||  || — || June 5, 2007 || Catalina || CSS || — || align=right | 1.6 km || 
|-id=458 bgcolor=#d6d6d6
| 266458 ||  || — || June 8, 2007 || Kitt Peak || Spacewatch || — || align=right | 4.2 km || 
|-id=459 bgcolor=#d6d6d6
| 266459 ||  || — || June 9, 2007 || Kitt Peak || Spacewatch || — || align=right | 5.0 km || 
|-id=460 bgcolor=#d6d6d6
| 266460 ||  || — || June 8, 2007 || Kitt Peak || Spacewatch || 627 || align=right | 4.6 km || 
|-id=461 bgcolor=#d6d6d6
| 266461 ||  || — || June 11, 2007 || Kitt Peak || Spacewatch || — || align=right | 5.5 km || 
|-id=462 bgcolor=#d6d6d6
| 266462 ||  || — || June 14, 2007 || Kitt Peak || Spacewatch || THM || align=right | 2.8 km || 
|-id=463 bgcolor=#d6d6d6
| 266463 ||  || — || June 10, 2007 || Kitt Peak || Spacewatch || EOS || align=right | 2.4 km || 
|-id=464 bgcolor=#d6d6d6
| 266464 ||  || — || June 10, 2007 || Kitt Peak || Spacewatch || EOS || align=right | 2.5 km || 
|-id=465 bgcolor=#d6d6d6
| 266465 Andalucia ||  ||  || July 16, 2007 || La Sagra || OAM Obs. || — || align=right | 5.8 km || 
|-id=466 bgcolor=#d6d6d6
| 266466 ||  || — || August 9, 2007 || Socorro || LINEAR || — || align=right | 5.3 km || 
|-id=467 bgcolor=#fefefe
| 266467 ||  || — || September 11, 2007 || Siding Spring || SSS || — || align=right | 1.00 km || 
|-id=468 bgcolor=#fefefe
| 266468 ||  || — || September 14, 2007 || Socorro || LINEAR || H || align=right data-sort-value="0.92" | 920 m || 
|-id=469 bgcolor=#E9E9E9
| 266469 ||  || — || November 3, 2007 || Kitt Peak || Spacewatch || EUN || align=right | 4.3 km || 
|-id=470 bgcolor=#fefefe
| 266470 ||  || — || November 3, 2007 || Mount Lemmon || Mount Lemmon Survey || NYS || align=right data-sort-value="0.76" | 760 m || 
|-id=471 bgcolor=#fefefe
| 266471 ||  || — || December 16, 2007 || La Sagra || OAM Obs. || — || align=right | 1.3 km || 
|-id=472 bgcolor=#fefefe
| 266472 ||  || — || January 11, 2008 || Mount Lemmon || Mount Lemmon Survey || — || align=right data-sort-value="0.89" | 890 m || 
|-id=473 bgcolor=#fefefe
| 266473 ||  || — || January 13, 2008 || Kitt Peak || Spacewatch || — || align=right data-sort-value="0.98" | 980 m || 
|-id=474 bgcolor=#fefefe
| 266474 ||  || — || January 15, 2008 || Kitt Peak || Spacewatch || FLO || align=right data-sort-value="0.72" | 720 m || 
|-id=475 bgcolor=#fefefe
| 266475 ||  || — || January 1, 2008 || Catalina || CSS || H || align=right | 1.3 km || 
|-id=476 bgcolor=#fefefe
| 266476 ||  || — || January 31, 2008 || Mount Lemmon || Mount Lemmon Survey || — || align=right data-sort-value="0.87" | 870 m || 
|-id=477 bgcolor=#fefefe
| 266477 ||  || — || February 3, 2008 || Socorro || LINEAR || H || align=right | 1.3 km || 
|-id=478 bgcolor=#d6d6d6
| 266478 ||  || — || February 2, 2008 || Kitt Peak || Spacewatch || — || align=right | 3.0 km || 
|-id=479 bgcolor=#fefefe
| 266479 ||  || — || February 2, 2008 || Kitt Peak || Spacewatch || — || align=right data-sort-value="0.90" | 900 m || 
|-id=480 bgcolor=#fefefe
| 266480 ||  || — || February 2, 2008 || Kitt Peak || Spacewatch || — || align=right | 1.3 km || 
|-id=481 bgcolor=#fefefe
| 266481 ||  || — || February 7, 2008 || Catalina || CSS || V || align=right data-sort-value="0.76" | 760 m || 
|-id=482 bgcolor=#fefefe
| 266482 ||  || — || February 7, 2008 || Kitt Peak || Spacewatch || — || align=right data-sort-value="0.85" | 850 m || 
|-id=483 bgcolor=#fefefe
| 266483 ||  || — || February 8, 2008 || Kitt Peak || Spacewatch || — || align=right | 1.2 km || 
|-id=484 bgcolor=#fefefe
| 266484 ||  || — || February 9, 2008 || Kitt Peak || Spacewatch || FLO || align=right data-sort-value="0.82" | 820 m || 
|-id=485 bgcolor=#fefefe
| 266485 ||  || — || February 9, 2008 || Kitt Peak || Spacewatch || — || align=right data-sort-value="0.71" | 710 m || 
|-id=486 bgcolor=#fefefe
| 266486 ||  || — || February 10, 2008 || Mount Lemmon || Mount Lemmon Survey || FLO || align=right data-sort-value="0.79" | 790 m || 
|-id=487 bgcolor=#fefefe
| 266487 ||  || — || February 6, 2008 || Socorro || LINEAR || FLO || align=right | 1.0 km || 
|-id=488 bgcolor=#fefefe
| 266488 ||  || — || February 13, 2008 || Mount Lemmon || Mount Lemmon Survey || V || align=right data-sort-value="0.74" | 740 m || 
|-id=489 bgcolor=#d6d6d6
| 266489 ||  || — || February 6, 2008 || Catalina || CSS || — || align=right | 6.3 km || 
|-id=490 bgcolor=#d6d6d6
| 266490 ||  || — || February 26, 2008 || Mount Lemmon || Mount Lemmon Survey || — || align=right | 3.5 km || 
|-id=491 bgcolor=#fefefe
| 266491 ||  || — || February 27, 2008 || Kitt Peak || Spacewatch || — || align=right data-sort-value="0.87" | 870 m || 
|-id=492 bgcolor=#E9E9E9
| 266492 ||  || — || February 28, 2008 || Kitt Peak || Spacewatch || — || align=right | 2.5 km || 
|-id=493 bgcolor=#fefefe
| 266493 ||  || — || February 28, 2008 || Kitt Peak || Spacewatch || V || align=right data-sort-value="0.89" | 890 m || 
|-id=494 bgcolor=#fefefe
| 266494 ||  || — || February 28, 2008 || Mount Lemmon || Mount Lemmon Survey || — || align=right data-sort-value="0.97" | 970 m || 
|-id=495 bgcolor=#fefefe
| 266495 ||  || — || February 26, 2008 || Kitt Peak || Spacewatch || FLO || align=right data-sort-value="0.73" | 730 m || 
|-id=496 bgcolor=#fefefe
| 266496 ||  || — || February 29, 2008 || Kitt Peak || Spacewatch || — || align=right | 1.1 km || 
|-id=497 bgcolor=#fefefe
| 266497 ||  || — || February 28, 2008 || Mount Lemmon || Mount Lemmon Survey || MAS || align=right | 1.0 km || 
|-id=498 bgcolor=#E9E9E9
| 266498 ||  || — || February 18, 2008 || Mount Lemmon || Mount Lemmon Survey || — || align=right | 3.1 km || 
|-id=499 bgcolor=#fefefe
| 266499 ||  || — || February 28, 2008 || Kitt Peak || Spacewatch || NYS || align=right data-sort-value="0.76" | 760 m || 
|-id=500 bgcolor=#fefefe
| 266500 ||  || — || September 28, 2003 || Anderson Mesa || LONEOS || — || align=right data-sort-value="0.93" | 930 m || 
|}

266501–266600 

|-bgcolor=#fefefe
| 266501 ||  || — || March 1, 2008 || Kitt Peak || Spacewatch || — || align=right | 1.1 km || 
|-id=502 bgcolor=#fefefe
| 266502 ||  || — || March 1, 2008 || Kitt Peak || Spacewatch || — || align=right data-sort-value="0.87" | 870 m || 
|-id=503 bgcolor=#fefefe
| 266503 ||  || — || March 1, 2008 || Kitt Peak || Spacewatch || V || align=right data-sort-value="0.90" | 900 m || 
|-id=504 bgcolor=#fefefe
| 266504 ||  || — || March 2, 2008 || Kitt Peak || Spacewatch || — || align=right data-sort-value="0.76" | 760 m || 
|-id=505 bgcolor=#fefefe
| 266505 ||  || — || March 4, 2008 || Kitt Peak || Spacewatch || — || align=right | 1.5 km || 
|-id=506 bgcolor=#fefefe
| 266506 ||  || — || March 4, 2008 || Kitt Peak || Spacewatch || FLO || align=right data-sort-value="0.86" | 860 m || 
|-id=507 bgcolor=#fefefe
| 266507 ||  || — || March 4, 2008 || Kitt Peak || Spacewatch || — || align=right data-sort-value="0.90" | 900 m || 
|-id=508 bgcolor=#fefefe
| 266508 ||  || — || March 5, 2008 || Kitt Peak || Spacewatch || NYS || align=right data-sort-value="0.69" | 690 m || 
|-id=509 bgcolor=#fefefe
| 266509 ||  || — || March 6, 2008 || Kitt Peak || Spacewatch || — || align=right | 1.1 km || 
|-id=510 bgcolor=#fefefe
| 266510 ||  || — || March 6, 2008 || Kitt Peak || Spacewatch || FLO || align=right | 1.0 km || 
|-id=511 bgcolor=#d6d6d6
| 266511 ||  || — || March 9, 2008 || Mount Lemmon || Mount Lemmon Survey || — || align=right | 3.2 km || 
|-id=512 bgcolor=#fefefe
| 266512 ||  || — || March 6, 2008 || Mount Lemmon || Mount Lemmon Survey || — || align=right | 1.4 km || 
|-id=513 bgcolor=#fefefe
| 266513 ||  || — || March 7, 2008 || Kitt Peak || Spacewatch || — || align=right data-sort-value="0.66" | 660 m || 
|-id=514 bgcolor=#fefefe
| 266514 ||  || — || March 7, 2008 || Kitt Peak || Spacewatch || — || align=right data-sort-value="0.61" | 610 m || 
|-id=515 bgcolor=#fefefe
| 266515 ||  || — || March 9, 2008 || Kitt Peak || Spacewatch || — || align=right data-sort-value="0.88" | 880 m || 
|-id=516 bgcolor=#fefefe
| 266516 ||  || — || March 11, 2008 || Kitt Peak || Spacewatch || — || align=right | 1.2 km || 
|-id=517 bgcolor=#fefefe
| 266517 ||  || — || March 12, 2008 || Kitt Peak || Spacewatch || — || align=right | 1.0 km || 
|-id=518 bgcolor=#fefefe
| 266518 ||  || — || March 2, 2008 || Kitt Peak || Spacewatch || — || align=right | 1.1 km || 
|-id=519 bgcolor=#fefefe
| 266519 ||  || — || March 10, 2008 || Kitt Peak || Spacewatch || — || align=right data-sort-value="0.78" | 780 m || 
|-id=520 bgcolor=#fefefe
| 266520 ||  || — || March 11, 2008 || Kitt Peak || Spacewatch || — || align=right data-sort-value="0.75" | 750 m || 
|-id=521 bgcolor=#d6d6d6
| 266521 ||  || — || August 9, 2004 || Siding Spring || SSS || — || align=right | 3.8 km || 
|-id=522 bgcolor=#fefefe
| 266522 ||  || — || March 5, 2008 || Mount Lemmon || Mount Lemmon Survey || V || align=right | 1.0 km || 
|-id=523 bgcolor=#fefefe
| 266523 ||  || — || March 9, 2008 || Socorro || LINEAR || — || align=right data-sort-value="0.98" | 980 m || 
|-id=524 bgcolor=#fefefe
| 266524 ||  || — || March 25, 2008 || Kitt Peak || Spacewatch || — || align=right data-sort-value="0.97" | 970 m || 
|-id=525 bgcolor=#E9E9E9
| 266525 ||  || — || March 26, 2008 || Kitt Peak || Spacewatch || EUN || align=right | 1.8 km || 
|-id=526 bgcolor=#fefefe
| 266526 ||  || — || March 27, 2008 || Kitt Peak || Spacewatch || V || align=right | 1.0 km || 
|-id=527 bgcolor=#fefefe
| 266527 ||  || — || March 27, 2008 || Mount Lemmon || Mount Lemmon Survey || — || align=right data-sort-value="0.58" | 580 m || 
|-id=528 bgcolor=#fefefe
| 266528 ||  || — || March 27, 2008 || Kitt Peak || Spacewatch || MAS || align=right data-sort-value="0.76" | 760 m || 
|-id=529 bgcolor=#fefefe
| 266529 ||  || — || March 27, 2008 || Kitt Peak || Spacewatch || — || align=right | 1.1 km || 
|-id=530 bgcolor=#fefefe
| 266530 ||  || — || March 28, 2008 || Kitt Peak || Spacewatch || — || align=right data-sort-value="0.77" | 770 m || 
|-id=531 bgcolor=#fefefe
| 266531 ||  || — || March 28, 2008 || Mount Lemmon || Mount Lemmon Survey || — || align=right | 1.2 km || 
|-id=532 bgcolor=#fefefe
| 266532 ||  || — || March 28, 2008 || Mount Lemmon || Mount Lemmon Survey || — || align=right data-sort-value="0.80" | 800 m || 
|-id=533 bgcolor=#fefefe
| 266533 ||  || — || March 28, 2008 || Kitt Peak || Spacewatch || — || align=right data-sort-value="0.80" | 800 m || 
|-id=534 bgcolor=#fefefe
| 266534 ||  || — || March 28, 2008 || Mount Lemmon || Mount Lemmon Survey || — || align=right | 1.1 km || 
|-id=535 bgcolor=#fefefe
| 266535 ||  || — || March 28, 2008 || Kitt Peak || Spacewatch || — || align=right data-sort-value="0.82" | 820 m || 
|-id=536 bgcolor=#E9E9E9
| 266536 ||  || — || March 28, 2008 || Mount Lemmon || Mount Lemmon Survey || — || align=right | 1.7 km || 
|-id=537 bgcolor=#fefefe
| 266537 ||  || — || March 28, 2008 || Mount Lemmon || Mount Lemmon Survey || MAS || align=right | 1.1 km || 
|-id=538 bgcolor=#E9E9E9
| 266538 ||  || — || March 29, 2008 || Catalina || CSS || RAF || align=right | 1.6 km || 
|-id=539 bgcolor=#E9E9E9
| 266539 ||  || — || March 29, 2008 || Mount Lemmon || Mount Lemmon Survey || — || align=right | 1.3 km || 
|-id=540 bgcolor=#E9E9E9
| 266540 ||  || — || March 30, 2008 || Kitt Peak || Spacewatch || — || align=right | 1.7 km || 
|-id=541 bgcolor=#fefefe
| 266541 ||  || — || March 31, 2008 || Kitt Peak || Spacewatch || NYS || align=right data-sort-value="0.72" | 720 m || 
|-id=542 bgcolor=#fefefe
| 266542 ||  || — || March 31, 2008 || Kitt Peak || Spacewatch || NYS || align=right data-sort-value="0.87" | 870 m || 
|-id=543 bgcolor=#fefefe
| 266543 ||  || — || March 31, 2008 || Kitt Peak || Spacewatch || — || align=right | 1.3 km || 
|-id=544 bgcolor=#fefefe
| 266544 ||  || — || March 31, 2008 || Mount Lemmon || Mount Lemmon Survey || — || align=right data-sort-value="0.92" | 920 m || 
|-id=545 bgcolor=#fefefe
| 266545 ||  || — || March 29, 2008 || Kitt Peak || Spacewatch || V || align=right data-sort-value="0.97" | 970 m || 
|-id=546 bgcolor=#E9E9E9
| 266546 ||  || — || March 29, 2008 || Kitt Peak || Spacewatch || — || align=right | 1.4 km || 
|-id=547 bgcolor=#fefefe
| 266547 ||  || — || March 31, 2008 || Kitt Peak || Spacewatch || NYS || align=right data-sort-value="0.69" | 690 m || 
|-id=548 bgcolor=#fefefe
| 266548 ||  || — || March 28, 2008 || Kitt Peak || Spacewatch || — || align=right | 1.4 km || 
|-id=549 bgcolor=#fefefe
| 266549 ||  || — || March 29, 2008 || Mount Lemmon || Mount Lemmon Survey || NYS || align=right data-sort-value="0.92" | 920 m || 
|-id=550 bgcolor=#fefefe
| 266550 ||  || — || April 1, 2008 || Kitt Peak || Spacewatch || V || align=right | 1.1 km || 
|-id=551 bgcolor=#fefefe
| 266551 ||  || — || April 3, 2008 || Mount Lemmon || Mount Lemmon Survey || EUT || align=right data-sort-value="0.85" | 850 m || 
|-id=552 bgcolor=#fefefe
| 266552 ||  || — || April 7, 2008 || Mayhill || W. G. Dillon || — || align=right data-sort-value="0.74" | 740 m || 
|-id=553 bgcolor=#E9E9E9
| 266553 ||  || — || April 3, 2008 || Kitt Peak || Spacewatch || — || align=right | 2.0 km || 
|-id=554 bgcolor=#fefefe
| 266554 ||  || — || April 3, 2008 || Mount Lemmon || Mount Lemmon Survey || — || align=right | 2.2 km || 
|-id=555 bgcolor=#fefefe
| 266555 ||  || — || April 3, 2008 || Kitt Peak || Spacewatch || — || align=right | 1.1 km || 
|-id=556 bgcolor=#fefefe
| 266556 ||  || — || April 3, 2008 || Kitt Peak || Spacewatch || NYS || align=right data-sort-value="0.77" | 770 m || 
|-id=557 bgcolor=#fefefe
| 266557 ||  || — || April 3, 2008 || Kitt Peak || Spacewatch || — || align=right | 1.1 km || 
|-id=558 bgcolor=#fefefe
| 266558 ||  || — || April 3, 2008 || Mount Lemmon || Mount Lemmon Survey || — || align=right | 1.1 km || 
|-id=559 bgcolor=#fefefe
| 266559 ||  || — || April 4, 2008 || Kitt Peak || Spacewatch || — || align=right data-sort-value="0.79" | 790 m || 
|-id=560 bgcolor=#fefefe
| 266560 ||  || — || April 5, 2008 || Mount Lemmon || Mount Lemmon Survey || — || align=right data-sort-value="0.88" | 880 m || 
|-id=561 bgcolor=#fefefe
| 266561 ||  || — || April 5, 2008 || Catalina || CSS || FLO || align=right data-sort-value="0.97" | 970 m || 
|-id=562 bgcolor=#fefefe
| 266562 ||  || — || April 5, 2008 || Catalina || CSS || NYS || align=right data-sort-value="0.83" | 830 m || 
|-id=563 bgcolor=#fefefe
| 266563 ||  || — || April 5, 2008 || Catalina || CSS || — || align=right data-sort-value="0.71" | 710 m || 
|-id=564 bgcolor=#fefefe
| 266564 ||  || — || April 6, 2008 || Mount Lemmon || Mount Lemmon Survey || V || align=right data-sort-value="0.80" | 800 m || 
|-id=565 bgcolor=#fefefe
| 266565 ||  || — || April 7, 2008 || Kitt Peak || Spacewatch || — || align=right | 1.1 km || 
|-id=566 bgcolor=#fefefe
| 266566 ||  || — || April 11, 2008 || Kitt Peak || Spacewatch || — || align=right data-sort-value="0.90" | 900 m || 
|-id=567 bgcolor=#fefefe
| 266567 ||  || — || April 11, 2008 || Kitt Peak || Spacewatch || FLO || align=right data-sort-value="0.83" | 830 m || 
|-id=568 bgcolor=#fefefe
| 266568 ||  || — || April 12, 2008 || Catalina || CSS || — || align=right | 1.1 km || 
|-id=569 bgcolor=#fefefe
| 266569 ||  || — || April 13, 2008 || Kitt Peak || Spacewatch || NYS || align=right data-sort-value="0.91" | 910 m || 
|-id=570 bgcolor=#fefefe
| 266570 ||  || — || April 2, 2008 || Kitt Peak || Spacewatch || NYS || align=right data-sort-value="0.76" | 760 m || 
|-id=571 bgcolor=#fefefe
| 266571 ||  || — || April 4, 2008 || Mount Lemmon || Mount Lemmon Survey || V || align=right data-sort-value="0.91" | 910 m || 
|-id=572 bgcolor=#fefefe
| 266572 ||  || — || April 12, 2008 || Kitt Peak || Spacewatch || — || align=right data-sort-value="0.89" | 890 m || 
|-id=573 bgcolor=#fefefe
| 266573 ||  || — || April 24, 2008 || Kitt Peak || Spacewatch || — || align=right | 1.3 km || 
|-id=574 bgcolor=#fefefe
| 266574 ||  || — || April 24, 2008 || Andrushivka || Andrushivka Obs. || NYS || align=right data-sort-value="0.80" | 800 m || 
|-id=575 bgcolor=#fefefe
| 266575 ||  || — || April 24, 2008 || Kitt Peak || Spacewatch || — || align=right data-sort-value="0.68" | 680 m || 
|-id=576 bgcolor=#d6d6d6
| 266576 ||  || — || April 24, 2008 || Kitt Peak || Spacewatch || — || align=right | 3.9 km || 
|-id=577 bgcolor=#fefefe
| 266577 ||  || — || April 24, 2008 || Kitt Peak || Spacewatch || — || align=right data-sort-value="0.98" | 980 m || 
|-id=578 bgcolor=#E9E9E9
| 266578 ||  || — || April 24, 2008 || Catalina || CSS || RAF || align=right | 1.3 km || 
|-id=579 bgcolor=#fefefe
| 266579 ||  || — || April 25, 2008 || Kitt Peak || Spacewatch || NYS || align=right data-sort-value="0.81" | 810 m || 
|-id=580 bgcolor=#fefefe
| 266580 ||  || — || April 26, 2008 || Kitt Peak || Spacewatch || — || align=right | 1.3 km || 
|-id=581 bgcolor=#d6d6d6
| 266581 ||  || — || April 26, 2008 || Mount Lemmon || Mount Lemmon Survey || — || align=right | 5.1 km || 
|-id=582 bgcolor=#fefefe
| 266582 ||  || — || April 27, 2008 || Kitt Peak || Spacewatch || CLA || align=right | 1.9 km || 
|-id=583 bgcolor=#fefefe
| 266583 ||  || — || April 28, 2008 || Kitt Peak || Spacewatch || NYS || align=right | 1.1 km || 
|-id=584 bgcolor=#fefefe
| 266584 ||  || — || April 26, 2008 || Kitt Peak || Spacewatch || V || align=right data-sort-value="0.89" | 890 m || 
|-id=585 bgcolor=#fefefe
| 266585 ||  || — || April 28, 2008 || Kitt Peak || Spacewatch || — || align=right | 1.2 km || 
|-id=586 bgcolor=#fefefe
| 266586 ||  || — || April 28, 2008 || Kitt Peak || Spacewatch || V || align=right data-sort-value="0.97" | 970 m || 
|-id=587 bgcolor=#fefefe
| 266587 ||  || — || April 29, 2008 || Mount Lemmon || Mount Lemmon Survey || — || align=right | 1.2 km || 
|-id=588 bgcolor=#d6d6d6
| 266588 ||  || — || April 29, 2008 || Kitt Peak || Spacewatch || Tj (2.99) || align=right | 5.4 km || 
|-id=589 bgcolor=#fefefe
| 266589 ||  || — || April 30, 2008 || Mount Lemmon || Mount Lemmon Survey || — || align=right | 1.2 km || 
|-id=590 bgcolor=#d6d6d6
| 266590 ||  || — || April 29, 2008 || Mount Lemmon || Mount Lemmon Survey || — || align=right | 3.3 km || 
|-id=591 bgcolor=#d6d6d6
| 266591 ||  || — || April 30, 2008 || Kitt Peak || Spacewatch || HIL3:2 || align=right | 6.6 km || 
|-id=592 bgcolor=#fefefe
| 266592 ||  || — || April 29, 2008 || Socorro || LINEAR || — || align=right data-sort-value="0.95" | 950 m || 
|-id=593 bgcolor=#fefefe
| 266593 ||  || — || May 1, 2008 || Catalina || CSS || — || align=right | 1.0 km || 
|-id=594 bgcolor=#E9E9E9
| 266594 ||  || — || May 2, 2008 || Catalina || CSS || — || align=right | 2.0 km || 
|-id=595 bgcolor=#E9E9E9
| 266595 ||  || — || May 3, 2008 || Kitt Peak || Spacewatch || — || align=right | 1.0 km || 
|-id=596 bgcolor=#E9E9E9
| 266596 ||  || — || May 3, 2008 || Kitt Peak || Spacewatch || — || align=right | 1.3 km || 
|-id=597 bgcolor=#fefefe
| 266597 ||  || — || May 6, 2008 || Dauban || F. Kugel || V || align=right data-sort-value="0.69" | 690 m || 
|-id=598 bgcolor=#E9E9E9
| 266598 ||  || — || May 6, 2008 || Kitt Peak || Spacewatch || — || align=right | 2.0 km || 
|-id=599 bgcolor=#fefefe
| 266599 ||  || — || May 7, 2008 || Kitt Peak || Spacewatch || MAS || align=right data-sort-value="0.82" | 820 m || 
|-id=600 bgcolor=#fefefe
| 266600 ||  || — || May 8, 2008 || Mount Lemmon || Mount Lemmon Survey || EUT || align=right data-sort-value="0.66" | 660 m || 
|}

266601–266700 

|-bgcolor=#E9E9E9
| 266601 ||  || — || May 14, 2008 || Kitt Peak || Spacewatch || — || align=right | 2.0 km || 
|-id=602 bgcolor=#fefefe
| 266602 ||  || — || May 5, 2008 || Mount Lemmon || Mount Lemmon Survey || FLO || align=right data-sort-value="0.81" | 810 m || 
|-id=603 bgcolor=#fefefe
| 266603 ||  || — || May 13, 2008 || Mount Lemmon || Mount Lemmon Survey || MAS || align=right data-sort-value="0.86" | 860 m || 
|-id=604 bgcolor=#fefefe
| 266604 ||  || — || May 27, 2008 || Kitt Peak || Spacewatch || — || align=right data-sort-value="0.90" | 900 m || 
|-id=605 bgcolor=#E9E9E9
| 266605 ||  || — || May 28, 2008 || Mount Lemmon || Mount Lemmon Survey || — || align=right | 1.9 km || 
|-id=606 bgcolor=#fefefe
| 266606 ||  || — || May 30, 2008 || Kitt Peak || Spacewatch || FLO || align=right data-sort-value="0.89" | 890 m || 
|-id=607 bgcolor=#fefefe
| 266607 ||  || — || June 10, 2008 || Kitt Peak || Spacewatch || V || align=right data-sort-value="0.65" | 650 m || 
|-id=608 bgcolor=#E9E9E9
| 266608 ||  || — || June 14, 2008 || Eskridge || G. Hug || — || align=right | 1.6 km || 
|-id=609 bgcolor=#E9E9E9
| 266609 ||  || — || June 26, 2008 || La Sagra || OAM Obs. || — || align=right | 1.7 km || 
|-id=610 bgcolor=#E9E9E9
| 266610 ||  || — || July 27, 2008 || Bisei SG Center || BATTeRS || MRX || align=right | 1.5 km || 
|-id=611 bgcolor=#d6d6d6
| 266611 ||  || — || July 29, 2008 || La Sagra || OAM Obs. || — || align=right | 5.1 km || 
|-id=612 bgcolor=#d6d6d6
| 266612 ||  || — || July 29, 2008 || La Sagra || OAM Obs. || THM || align=right | 4.0 km || 
|-id=613 bgcolor=#E9E9E9
| 266613 ||  || — || July 31, 2008 || Hibiscus || S. F. Hönig, N. Teamo || — || align=right | 2.5 km || 
|-id=614 bgcolor=#d6d6d6
| 266614 ||  || — || July 30, 2008 || Reedy Creek || J. Broughton || TIR || align=right | 4.4 km || 
|-id=615 bgcolor=#d6d6d6
| 266615 ||  || — || July 25, 2008 || La Sagra || OAM Obs. || — || align=right | 4.1 km || 
|-id=616 bgcolor=#d6d6d6
| 266616 ||  || — || July 30, 2008 || Kitt Peak || Spacewatch || EOS || align=right | 2.7 km || 
|-id=617 bgcolor=#E9E9E9
| 266617 ||  || — || July 30, 2008 || Kitt Peak || Spacewatch || EUN || align=right | 1.8 km || 
|-id=618 bgcolor=#d6d6d6
| 266618 ||  || — || August 3, 2008 || Pla D'Arguines || R. Ferrando || — || align=right | 4.3 km || 
|-id=619 bgcolor=#d6d6d6
| 266619 ||  || — || August 4, 2008 || La Sagra || OAM Obs. || — || align=right | 3.3 km || 
|-id=620 bgcolor=#d6d6d6
| 266620 ||  || — || August 10, 2008 || Dauban || F. Kugel || — || align=right | 4.8 km || 
|-id=621 bgcolor=#E9E9E9
| 266621 ||  || — || August 7, 2008 || Tiki || N. Teamo || — || align=right | 1.8 km || 
|-id=622 bgcolor=#d6d6d6
| 266622 Málna ||  ||  || August 24, 2008 || Piszkéstető || K. Sárneczky || — || align=right | 2.8 km || 
|-id=623 bgcolor=#d6d6d6
| 266623 ||  || — || August 22, 2008 || Kitt Peak || Spacewatch || — || align=right | 2.8 km || 
|-id=624 bgcolor=#d6d6d6
| 266624 ||  || — || August 25, 2008 || La Sagra || OAM Obs. || — || align=right | 4.3 km || 
|-id=625 bgcolor=#d6d6d6
| 266625 ||  || — || August 26, 2008 || La Sagra || OAM Obs. || — || align=right | 4.0 km || 
|-id=626 bgcolor=#d6d6d6
| 266626 ||  || — || August 26, 2008 || Socorro || LINEAR || — || align=right | 5.1 km || 
|-id=627 bgcolor=#d6d6d6
| 266627 ||  || — || August 29, 2008 || La Sagra || OAM Obs. || — || align=right | 3.1 km || 
|-id=628 bgcolor=#d6d6d6
| 266628 ||  || — || August 30, 2008 || Socorro || LINEAR || 7:4 || align=right | 5.1 km || 
|-id=629 bgcolor=#d6d6d6
| 266629 ||  || — || August 23, 2008 || Kitt Peak || Spacewatch || — || align=right | 3.8 km || 
|-id=630 bgcolor=#d6d6d6
| 266630 ||  || — || September 2, 2008 || Kitt Peak || Spacewatch || — || align=right | 3.4 km || 
|-id=631 bgcolor=#d6d6d6
| 266631 ||  || — || September 6, 2008 || Mount Lemmon || Mount Lemmon Survey || — || align=right | 2.9 km || 
|-id=632 bgcolor=#E9E9E9
| 266632 ||  || — || September 6, 2008 || Mount Lemmon || Mount Lemmon Survey || — || align=right | 1.9 km || 
|-id=633 bgcolor=#d6d6d6
| 266633 ||  || — || September 9, 2008 || Bisei SG Center || BATTeRS || EOS || align=right | 3.6 km || 
|-id=634 bgcolor=#E9E9E9
| 266634 ||  || — || September 4, 2008 || Kitt Peak || Spacewatch || — || align=right | 4.0 km || 
|-id=635 bgcolor=#d6d6d6
| 266635 ||  || — || September 4, 2008 || Kitt Peak || Spacewatch || — || align=right | 4.4 km || 
|-id=636 bgcolor=#d6d6d6
| 266636 ||  || — || September 7, 2008 || Catalina || CSS || HYG || align=right | 3.0 km || 
|-id=637 bgcolor=#E9E9E9
| 266637 ||  || — || September 2, 2008 || Kitt Peak || Spacewatch || — || align=right | 2.7 km || 
|-id=638 bgcolor=#E9E9E9
| 266638 ||  || — || September 7, 2008 || Mount Lemmon || Mount Lemmon Survey || AEO || align=right | 1.5 km || 
|-id=639 bgcolor=#d6d6d6
| 266639 ||  || — || September 6, 2008 || Kitt Peak || Spacewatch || — || align=right | 3.2 km || 
|-id=640 bgcolor=#d6d6d6
| 266640 ||  || — || September 4, 2008 || Kitt Peak || Spacewatch || — || align=right | 4.0 km || 
|-id=641 bgcolor=#d6d6d6
| 266641 ||  || — || September 19, 2008 || Kitt Peak || Spacewatch || HYG || align=right | 3.7 km || 
|-id=642 bgcolor=#E9E9E9
| 266642 ||  || — || September 19, 2008 || Kitt Peak || Spacewatch || — || align=right | 2.7 km || 
|-id=643 bgcolor=#d6d6d6
| 266643 ||  || — || September 21, 2008 || Kitt Peak || Spacewatch || 7:4 || align=right | 4.2 km || 
|-id=644 bgcolor=#C2FFFF
| 266644 ||  || — || September 24, 2008 || Mount Lemmon || Mount Lemmon Survey || L4 || align=right | 9.5 km || 
|-id=645 bgcolor=#d6d6d6
| 266645 ||  || — || September 26, 2008 || Kitt Peak || Spacewatch || — || align=right | 3.3 km || 
|-id=646 bgcolor=#E9E9E9
| 266646 Zaphod ||  ||  || September 28, 2008 || Charleston || ARO || XIZ || align=right | 2.0 km || 
|-id=647 bgcolor=#C2FFFF
| 266647 ||  || — || September 28, 2008 || Mount Lemmon || Mount Lemmon Survey || L4ERY || align=right | 11 km || 
|-id=648 bgcolor=#C2FFFF
| 266648 ||  || — || September 23, 2008 || Mount Lemmon || Mount Lemmon Survey || L4 || align=right | 11 km || 
|-id=649 bgcolor=#d6d6d6
| 266649 ||  || — || September 23, 2008 || Kitt Peak || Spacewatch || 3:2 || align=right | 7.4 km || 
|-id=650 bgcolor=#d6d6d6
| 266650 ||  || — || October 2, 2008 || Socorro || LINEAR || EUP || align=right | 6.0 km || 
|-id=651 bgcolor=#d6d6d6
| 266651 ||  || — || October 1, 2008 || La Sagra || OAM Obs. || — || align=right | 3.4 km || 
|-id=652 bgcolor=#d6d6d6
| 266652 ||  || — || October 1, 2008 || Mount Lemmon || Mount Lemmon Survey || — || align=right | 3.6 km || 
|-id=653 bgcolor=#d6d6d6
| 266653 ||  || — || October 1, 2008 || Kitt Peak || Spacewatch || THM || align=right | 3.5 km || 
|-id=654 bgcolor=#d6d6d6
| 266654 ||  || — || October 3, 2008 || Kitt Peak || Spacewatch || — || align=right | 3.9 km || 
|-id=655 bgcolor=#d6d6d6
| 266655 ||  || — || October 7, 2008 || Catalina || CSS || 7:4 || align=right | 5.7 km || 
|-id=656 bgcolor=#C2FFFF
| 266656 ||  || — || October 9, 2008 || Mount Lemmon || Mount Lemmon Survey || L4 || align=right | 11 km || 
|-id=657 bgcolor=#d6d6d6
| 266657 ||  || — || October 1, 2008 || Catalina || CSS || — || align=right | 6.0 km || 
|-id=658 bgcolor=#d6d6d6
| 266658 ||  || — || October 9, 2008 || Catalina || CSS || EOS || align=right | 3.0 km || 
|-id=659 bgcolor=#d6d6d6
| 266659 ||  || — || October 1, 2008 || Kitt Peak || Spacewatch || THM || align=right | 2.8 km || 
|-id=660 bgcolor=#d6d6d6
| 266660 ||  || — || October 22, 2008 || Mount Lemmon || Mount Lemmon Survey || — || align=right | 4.1 km || 
|-id=661 bgcolor=#E9E9E9
| 266661 ||  || — || October 25, 2008 || Mount Lemmon || Mount Lemmon Survey || — || align=right | 2.4 km || 
|-id=662 bgcolor=#C2FFFF
| 266662 ||  || — || October 23, 2008 || Kitt Peak || Spacewatch || L4 || align=right | 6.4 km || 
|-id=663 bgcolor=#fefefe
| 266663 ||  || — || October 25, 2008 || Kitt Peak || Spacewatch || V || align=right data-sort-value="0.64" | 640 m || 
|-id=664 bgcolor=#d6d6d6
| 266664 ||  || — || November 6, 2008 || Kitt Peak || Spacewatch || EMA || align=right | 5.6 km || 
|-id=665 bgcolor=#fefefe
| 266665 ||  || — || November 1, 2008 || Mount Lemmon || Mount Lemmon Survey || FLO || align=right data-sort-value="0.84" | 840 m || 
|-id=666 bgcolor=#d6d6d6
| 266666 ||  || — || November 3, 2008 || Mount Lemmon || Mount Lemmon Survey || — || align=right | 5.1 km || 
|-id=667 bgcolor=#fefefe
| 266667 ||  || — || November 30, 2008 || Mount Lemmon || Mount Lemmon Survey || — || align=right data-sort-value="0.67" | 670 m || 
|-id=668 bgcolor=#E9E9E9
| 266668 ||  || — || November 20, 2008 || Socorro || LINEAR || — || align=right | 1.7 km || 
|-id=669 bgcolor=#E9E9E9
| 266669 ||  || — || December 1, 2008 || Catalina || CSS || — || align=right | 3.5 km || 
|-id=670 bgcolor=#d6d6d6
| 266670 ||  || — || December 30, 2008 || Mount Lemmon || Mount Lemmon Survey || HYG || align=right | 3.1 km || 
|-id=671 bgcolor=#E9E9E9
| 266671 ||  || — || December 31, 2008 || Kitt Peak || Spacewatch || PAE || align=right | 2.3 km || 
|-id=672 bgcolor=#E9E9E9
| 266672 ||  || — || December 22, 2008 || Catalina || CSS || — || align=right | 1.8 km || 
|-id=673 bgcolor=#d6d6d6
| 266673 ||  || — || December 31, 2008 || Kitt Peak || Spacewatch || — || align=right | 5.6 km || 
|-id=674 bgcolor=#d6d6d6
| 266674 ||  || — || January 2, 2009 || Mount Lemmon || Mount Lemmon Survey || — || align=right | 2.9 km || 
|-id=675 bgcolor=#d6d6d6
| 266675 ||  || — || January 25, 2009 || Kitt Peak || Spacewatch || — || align=right | 4.5 km || 
|-id=676 bgcolor=#fefefe
| 266676 ||  || — || March 24, 2009 || Catalina || CSS || H || align=right data-sort-value="0.95" | 950 m || 
|-id=677 bgcolor=#fefefe
| 266677 ||  || — || April 22, 2009 || Mount Lemmon || Mount Lemmon Survey || FLO || align=right data-sort-value="0.67" | 670 m || 
|-id=678 bgcolor=#d6d6d6
| 266678 ||  || — || April 24, 2009 || Mount Lemmon || Mount Lemmon Survey || EUP || align=right | 5.9 km || 
|-id=679 bgcolor=#E9E9E9
| 266679 ||  || — || May 22, 2009 || Hibiscus || N. Teamo || RAF || align=right | 1.3 km || 
|-id=680 bgcolor=#fefefe
| 266680 ||  || — || June 23, 2009 || Mount Lemmon || Mount Lemmon Survey || H || align=right data-sort-value="0.78" | 780 m || 
|-id=681 bgcolor=#fefefe
| 266681 ||  || — || July 17, 2009 || La Sagra || OAM Obs. || — || align=right data-sort-value="0.98" | 980 m || 
|-id=682 bgcolor=#fefefe
| 266682 ||  || — || July 30, 2009 || Kitt Peak || Spacewatch || H || align=right | 1.1 km || 
|-id=683 bgcolor=#fefefe
| 266683 ||  || — || July 27, 2009 || Kitt Peak || Spacewatch || — || align=right | 1.3 km || 
|-id=684 bgcolor=#fefefe
| 266684 ||  || — || July 27, 2009 || Kitt Peak || Spacewatch || — || align=right data-sort-value="0.73" | 730 m || 
|-id=685 bgcolor=#E9E9E9
| 266685 ||  || — || July 28, 2009 || Kitt Peak || Spacewatch || AGN || align=right | 1.5 km || 
|-id=686 bgcolor=#E9E9E9
| 266686 ||  || — || July 29, 2009 || La Sagra || OAM Obs. || — || align=right | 1.8 km || 
|-id=687 bgcolor=#fefefe
| 266687 ||  || — || July 26, 2009 || La Sagra || OAM Obs. || NYS || align=right data-sort-value="0.90" | 900 m || 
|-id=688 bgcolor=#fefefe
| 266688 ||  || — || July 20, 2009 || Siding Spring || SSS || — || align=right | 1.1 km || 
|-id=689 bgcolor=#E9E9E9
| 266689 ||  || — || July 31, 2009 || Kitt Peak || Spacewatch || — || align=right | 1.1 km || 
|-id=690 bgcolor=#E9E9E9
| 266690 ||  || — || July 20, 2009 || Siding Spring || SSS || GEF || align=right | 1.7 km || 
|-id=691 bgcolor=#FA8072
| 266691 || 2009 PB || — || August 1, 2009 || Skylive Obs. || F. Tozzi || — || align=right | 1.7 km || 
|-id=692 bgcolor=#fefefe
| 266692 ||  || — || August 14, 2009 || Dauban || F. Kugel || NYS || align=right data-sort-value="0.88" | 880 m || 
|-id=693 bgcolor=#E9E9E9
| 266693 ||  || — || August 15, 2009 || Catalina || CSS || — || align=right | 1.7 km || 
|-id=694 bgcolor=#E9E9E9
| 266694 ||  || — || August 15, 2009 || Catalina || CSS || — || align=right | 1.3 km || 
|-id=695 bgcolor=#E9E9E9
| 266695 ||  || — || August 10, 2009 || Kitt Peak || Spacewatch || BRU || align=right | 5.2 km || 
|-id=696 bgcolor=#E9E9E9
| 266696 ||  || — || August 15, 2009 || Kitt Peak || Spacewatch || — || align=right | 2.7 km || 
|-id=697 bgcolor=#E9E9E9
| 266697 ||  || — || August 15, 2009 || Kitt Peak || Spacewatch || — || align=right | 2.4 km || 
|-id=698 bgcolor=#E9E9E9
| 266698 ||  || — || August 15, 2009 || Kitt Peak || Spacewatch || — || align=right | 2.8 km || 
|-id=699 bgcolor=#fefefe
| 266699 ||  || — || August 15, 2009 || Socorro || LINEAR || — || align=right | 1.5 km || 
|-id=700 bgcolor=#d6d6d6
| 266700 ||  || — || August 15, 2009 || Kitt Peak || Spacewatch || — || align=right | 2.9 km || 
|}

266701–266800 

|-bgcolor=#d6d6d6
| 266701 ||  || — || August 17, 2009 || Catalina || CSS || — || align=right | 4.5 km || 
|-id=702 bgcolor=#fefefe
| 266702 ||  || — || August 19, 2009 || Socorro || LINEAR || FLO || align=right data-sort-value="0.83" | 830 m || 
|-id=703 bgcolor=#E9E9E9
| 266703 ||  || — || August 18, 2009 || Bergisch Gladbac || W. Bickel || MRX || align=right | 1.1 km || 
|-id=704 bgcolor=#fefefe
| 266704 ||  || — || August 19, 2009 || La Sagra || OAM Obs. || — || align=right | 1.3 km || 
|-id=705 bgcolor=#fefefe
| 266705 ||  || — || August 20, 2009 || La Sagra || OAM Obs. || NYS || align=right data-sort-value="0.98" | 980 m || 
|-id=706 bgcolor=#fefefe
| 266706 ||  || — || August 21, 2009 || Dauban || F. Kugel || — || align=right data-sort-value="0.99" | 990 m || 
|-id=707 bgcolor=#d6d6d6
| 266707 ||  || — || August 24, 2009 || Farra d'Isonzo || Farra d'Isonzo || — || align=right | 4.5 km || 
|-id=708 bgcolor=#d6d6d6
| 266708 ||  || — || August 24, 2009 || La Sagra || OAM Obs. || — || align=right | 5.0 km || 
|-id=709 bgcolor=#E9E9E9
| 266709 ||  || — || August 26, 2009 || Catalina || CSS || BRU || align=right | 4.6 km || 
|-id=710 bgcolor=#d6d6d6
| 266710 Pedrettiadriana ||  ||  || August 31, 2009 || Haleakala || M. Micheli || — || align=right | 3.1 km || 
|-id=711 bgcolor=#E9E9E9
| 266711 Tuttlingen ||  ||  || August 30, 2009 || Taunus || R. Kling, U. Zimmer || — || align=right | 1.0 km || 
|-id=712 bgcolor=#E9E9E9
| 266712 ||  || — || August 28, 2009 || La Sagra || OAM Obs. || — || align=right | 1.8 km || 
|-id=713 bgcolor=#fefefe
| 266713 ||  || — || August 28, 2009 || La Sagra || OAM Obs. || — || align=right | 1.4 km || 
|-id=714 bgcolor=#E9E9E9
| 266714 ||  || — || August 28, 2009 || La Sagra || OAM Obs. || — || align=right | 3.4 km || 
|-id=715 bgcolor=#E9E9E9
| 266715 ||  || — || August 29, 2009 || La Sagra || OAM Obs. || — || align=right | 1.0 km || 
|-id=716 bgcolor=#d6d6d6
| 266716 ||  || — || August 16, 2009 || Kitt Peak || Spacewatch || KOR || align=right | 1.6 km || 
|-id=717 bgcolor=#fefefe
| 266717 ||  || — || August 29, 2009 || Kitt Peak || Spacewatch || — || align=right | 1.1 km || 
|-id=718 bgcolor=#fefefe
| 266718 ||  || — || August 19, 2009 || Kitt Peak || Spacewatch || — || align=right | 1.1 km || 
|-id=719 bgcolor=#d6d6d6
| 266719 ||  || — || August 27, 2009 || Kitt Peak || Spacewatch || — || align=right | 2.9 km || 
|-id=720 bgcolor=#fefefe
| 266720 ||  || — || September 9, 2009 || La Sagra || OAM Obs. || NYS || align=right data-sort-value="0.91" | 910 m || 
|-id=721 bgcolor=#fefefe
| 266721 ||  || — || September 10, 2009 || Catalina || CSS || — || align=right | 1.2 km || 
|-id=722 bgcolor=#d6d6d6
| 266722 ||  || — || September 12, 2009 || Kitt Peak || Spacewatch || HYG || align=right | 3.8 km || 
|-id=723 bgcolor=#d6d6d6
| 266723 ||  || — || September 12, 2009 || Kitt Peak || Spacewatch || KOR || align=right | 1.5 km || 
|-id=724 bgcolor=#fefefe
| 266724 ||  || — || September 12, 2009 || Kitt Peak || Spacewatch || — || align=right data-sort-value="0.90" | 900 m || 
|-id=725 bgcolor=#fefefe
| 266725 Vonputtkamer ||  ||  || September 13, 2009 || ESA OGS || M. Busch, R. Kresken || FLO || align=right data-sort-value="0.80" | 800 m || 
|-id=726 bgcolor=#d6d6d6
| 266726 ||  || — || September 14, 2009 || Kitt Peak || Spacewatch || — || align=right | 3.2 km || 
|-id=727 bgcolor=#E9E9E9
| 266727 ||  || — || September 14, 2009 || Kitt Peak || Spacewatch || — || align=right | 1.2 km || 
|-id=728 bgcolor=#E9E9E9
| 266728 ||  || — || September 14, 2009 || Kitt Peak || Spacewatch || MRX || align=right | 1.3 km || 
|-id=729 bgcolor=#E9E9E9
| 266729 ||  || — || September 14, 2009 || Kitt Peak || Spacewatch || — || align=right | 2.5 km || 
|-id=730 bgcolor=#E9E9E9
| 266730 ||  || — || September 15, 2009 || Kitt Peak || Spacewatch || — || align=right | 1.7 km || 
|-id=731 bgcolor=#d6d6d6
| 266731 ||  || — || September 15, 2009 || Kitt Peak || Spacewatch || THM || align=right | 2.6 km || 
|-id=732 bgcolor=#d6d6d6
| 266732 ||  || — || September 14, 2009 || Catalina || CSS || — || align=right | 3.8 km || 
|-id=733 bgcolor=#d6d6d6
| 266733 ||  || — || September 15, 2009 || Kitt Peak || Spacewatch || THM || align=right | 3.4 km || 
|-id=734 bgcolor=#fefefe
| 266734 || 2009 SO || — || September 16, 2009 || Great Shefford || P. Birtwhistle || ERI || align=right | 2.0 km || 
|-id=735 bgcolor=#d6d6d6
| 266735 ||  || — || September 16, 2009 || Kitt Peak || Spacewatch || HYG || align=right | 2.6 km || 
|-id=736 bgcolor=#C2FFFF
| 266736 ||  || — || September 16, 2009 || Kitt Peak || Spacewatch || L4 || align=right | 9.5 km || 
|-id=737 bgcolor=#fefefe
| 266737 ||  || — || September 22, 2009 || Bergisch Gladbac || W. Bickel || V || align=right data-sort-value="0.85" | 850 m || 
|-id=738 bgcolor=#E9E9E9
| 266738 ||  || — || September 16, 2009 || Kitt Peak || Spacewatch || MRX || align=right | 1.3 km || 
|-id=739 bgcolor=#fefefe
| 266739 ||  || — || September 16, 2009 || Kitt Peak || Spacewatch || — || align=right data-sort-value="0.99" | 990 m || 
|-id=740 bgcolor=#E9E9E9
| 266740 ||  || — || September 16, 2009 || Kitt Peak || Spacewatch || — || align=right data-sort-value="0.94" | 940 m || 
|-id=741 bgcolor=#E9E9E9
| 266741 ||  || — || September 16, 2009 || Kitt Peak || Spacewatch || — || align=right | 3.3 km || 
|-id=742 bgcolor=#E9E9E9
| 266742 ||  || — || September 16, 2009 || Kitt Peak || Spacewatch || NEM || align=right | 2.4 km || 
|-id=743 bgcolor=#d6d6d6
| 266743 ||  || — || September 16, 2009 || Kitt Peak || Spacewatch || — || align=right | 3.6 km || 
|-id=744 bgcolor=#d6d6d6
| 266744 ||  || — || September 17, 2009 || Kitt Peak || Spacewatch || — || align=right | 2.7 km || 
|-id=745 bgcolor=#fefefe
| 266745 ||  || — || September 17, 2009 || Kitt Peak || Spacewatch || — || align=right data-sort-value="0.96" | 960 m || 
|-id=746 bgcolor=#E9E9E9
| 266746 ||  || — || September 17, 2009 || Kitt Peak || Spacewatch || — || align=right | 2.0 km || 
|-id=747 bgcolor=#d6d6d6
| 266747 ||  || — || September 17, 2009 || Kitt Peak || Spacewatch || — || align=right | 2.8 km || 
|-id=748 bgcolor=#E9E9E9
| 266748 ||  || — || September 17, 2009 || Kitt Peak || Spacewatch || GEF || align=right | 1.8 km || 
|-id=749 bgcolor=#fefefe
| 266749 ||  || — || September 17, 2009 || Mount Lemmon || Mount Lemmon Survey || — || align=right data-sort-value="0.94" | 940 m || 
|-id=750 bgcolor=#d6d6d6
| 266750 ||  || — || September 17, 2009 || Kitt Peak || Spacewatch || THM || align=right | 2.4 km || 
|-id=751 bgcolor=#d6d6d6
| 266751 ||  || — || September 17, 2009 || Kitt Peak || Spacewatch || — || align=right | 3.6 km || 
|-id=752 bgcolor=#fefefe
| 266752 ||  || — || September 17, 2009 || Kitt Peak || Spacewatch || — || align=right | 1.1 km || 
|-id=753 bgcolor=#d6d6d6
| 266753 ||  || — || September 17, 2009 || Kitt Peak || Spacewatch || HYG || align=right | 2.7 km || 
|-id=754 bgcolor=#d6d6d6
| 266754 ||  || — || September 17, 2009 || Kitt Peak || Spacewatch || HYG || align=right | 3.2 km || 
|-id=755 bgcolor=#d6d6d6
| 266755 ||  || — || December 25, 2005 || Kitt Peak || Spacewatch || THM || align=right | 2.6 km || 
|-id=756 bgcolor=#fefefe
| 266756 ||  || — || September 18, 2009 || Mount Lemmon || Mount Lemmon Survey || NYS || align=right data-sort-value="0.79" | 790 m || 
|-id=757 bgcolor=#d6d6d6
| 266757 ||  || — || September 18, 2009 || Kitt Peak || Spacewatch || — || align=right | 2.1 km || 
|-id=758 bgcolor=#fefefe
| 266758 ||  || — || September 24, 2009 || Mayhill || A. Lowe || — || align=right | 1.2 km || 
|-id=759 bgcolor=#fefefe
| 266759 ||  || — || September 25, 2009 || Mayhill || A. Lowe || V || align=right data-sort-value="0.82" | 820 m || 
|-id=760 bgcolor=#E9E9E9
| 266760 ||  || — || September 17, 2009 || Mount Lemmon || Mount Lemmon Survey || MRX || align=right | 1.3 km || 
|-id=761 bgcolor=#d6d6d6
| 266761 ||  || — || September 18, 2009 || Kitt Peak || Spacewatch || HYG || align=right | 3.1 km || 
|-id=762 bgcolor=#fefefe
| 266762 ||  || — || September 18, 2009 || Kitt Peak || Spacewatch || NYS || align=right data-sort-value="0.79" | 790 m || 
|-id=763 bgcolor=#E9E9E9
| 266763 ||  || — || September 18, 2009 || Kitt Peak || Spacewatch || — || align=right | 2.2 km || 
|-id=764 bgcolor=#d6d6d6
| 266764 ||  || — || September 18, 2009 || Kitt Peak || Spacewatch || KOR || align=right | 1.7 km || 
|-id=765 bgcolor=#fefefe
| 266765 ||  || — || September 18, 2009 || Kitt Peak || Spacewatch || NYS || align=right data-sort-value="0.85" | 850 m || 
|-id=766 bgcolor=#E9E9E9
| 266766 ||  || — || September 18, 2009 || Kitt Peak || Spacewatch || HEN || align=right | 1.3 km || 
|-id=767 bgcolor=#fefefe
| 266767 ||  || — || September 18, 2009 || Kitt Peak || Spacewatch || V || align=right data-sort-value="0.65" | 650 m || 
|-id=768 bgcolor=#d6d6d6
| 266768 ||  || — || September 18, 2009 || Kitt Peak || Spacewatch || — || align=right | 3.0 km || 
|-id=769 bgcolor=#E9E9E9
| 266769 ||  || — || September 20, 2009 || Kitt Peak || Spacewatch || HOF || align=right | 3.0 km || 
|-id=770 bgcolor=#d6d6d6
| 266770 ||  || — || September 22, 2009 || La Sagra || OAM Obs. || EOS || align=right | 2.9 km || 
|-id=771 bgcolor=#fefefe
| 266771 ||  || — || September 24, 2009 || Bergisch Gladbac || W. Bickel || V || align=right data-sort-value="0.77" | 770 m || 
|-id=772 bgcolor=#C2FFFF
| 266772 ||  || — || February 13, 2002 || Apache Point || SDSS || L4 || align=right | 9.7 km || 
|-id=773 bgcolor=#d6d6d6
| 266773 ||  || — || September 21, 2009 || Kitt Peak || Spacewatch || — || align=right | 3.2 km || 
|-id=774 bgcolor=#d6d6d6
| 266774 ||  || — || September 22, 2009 || Kitt Peak || Spacewatch || — || align=right | 4.5 km || 
|-id=775 bgcolor=#d6d6d6
| 266775 ||  || — || September 22, 2009 || Kitt Peak || Spacewatch || — || align=right | 2.5 km || 
|-id=776 bgcolor=#E9E9E9
| 266776 ||  || — || September 22, 2009 || Kitt Peak || Spacewatch || — || align=right | 2.2 km || 
|-id=777 bgcolor=#E9E9E9
| 266777 ||  || — || September 23, 2009 || Kitt Peak || Spacewatch || — || align=right | 2.1 km || 
|-id=778 bgcolor=#E9E9E9
| 266778 ||  || — || September 23, 2009 || Kitt Peak || Spacewatch || — || align=right | 1.5 km || 
|-id=779 bgcolor=#C2FFFF
| 266779 ||  || — || March 13, 2002 || Kitt Peak || Spacewatch || L4 || align=right | 11 km || 
|-id=780 bgcolor=#fefefe
| 266780 ||  || — || September 24, 2009 || Mount Lemmon || Mount Lemmon Survey || — || align=right | 1.5 km || 
|-id=781 bgcolor=#d6d6d6
| 266781 ||  || — || September 16, 2009 || Catalina || CSS || TIR || align=right | 4.8 km || 
|-id=782 bgcolor=#fefefe
| 266782 ||  || — || September 16, 2009 || Catalina || CSS || — || align=right | 1.3 km || 
|-id=783 bgcolor=#fefefe
| 266783 ||  || — || September 18, 2009 || Catalina || CSS || — || align=right | 2.6 km || 
|-id=784 bgcolor=#E9E9E9
| 266784 ||  || — || September 17, 2009 || Kitt Peak || Spacewatch || — || align=right | 1.9 km || 
|-id=785 bgcolor=#d6d6d6
| 266785 ||  || — || September 20, 2009 || Kitt Peak || Spacewatch || — || align=right | 2.9 km || 
|-id=786 bgcolor=#E9E9E9
| 266786 ||  || — || September 22, 2009 || Kitt Peak || Spacewatch || — || align=right | 2.2 km || 
|-id=787 bgcolor=#E9E9E9
| 266787 ||  || — || September 22, 2009 || Mount Lemmon || Mount Lemmon Survey || — || align=right | 2.5 km || 
|-id=788 bgcolor=#d6d6d6
| 266788 ||  || — || September 23, 2009 || Mount Lemmon || Mount Lemmon Survey || 3:2 || align=right | 6.6 km || 
|-id=789 bgcolor=#d6d6d6
| 266789 ||  || — || October 9, 2004 || Kitt Peak || Spacewatch || — || align=right | 3.6 km || 
|-id=790 bgcolor=#E9E9E9
| 266790 ||  || — || September 24, 2009 || Kitt Peak || Spacewatch || WIT || align=right | 1.3 km || 
|-id=791 bgcolor=#C2FFFF
| 266791 ||  || — || September 24, 2009 || Kitt Peak || Spacewatch || L4 || align=right | 11 km || 
|-id=792 bgcolor=#E9E9E9
| 266792 ||  || — || September 25, 2009 || Kitt Peak || Spacewatch || — || align=right | 2.9 km || 
|-id=793 bgcolor=#d6d6d6
| 266793 ||  || — || September 25, 2009 || Kitt Peak || Spacewatch || — || align=right | 4.5 km || 
|-id=794 bgcolor=#E9E9E9
| 266794 ||  || — || September 16, 2009 || Catalina || CSS || — || align=right | 1.6 km || 
|-id=795 bgcolor=#d6d6d6
| 266795 ||  || — || September 17, 2009 || Kitt Peak || Spacewatch || — || align=right | 4.0 km || 
|-id=796 bgcolor=#d6d6d6
| 266796 ||  || — || September 18, 2009 || Kitt Peak || Spacewatch || KOR || align=right | 1.5 km || 
|-id=797 bgcolor=#E9E9E9
| 266797 ||  || — || September 19, 2009 || Kitt Peak || Spacewatch || MRX || align=right | 1.1 km || 
|-id=798 bgcolor=#d6d6d6
| 266798 ||  || — || September 26, 2009 || Kitt Peak || Spacewatch || — || align=right | 2.5 km || 
|-id=799 bgcolor=#E9E9E9
| 266799 ||  || — || September 27, 2009 || Kitt Peak || Spacewatch || — || align=right | 2.0 km || 
|-id=800 bgcolor=#d6d6d6
| 266800 ||  || — || September 22, 2009 || Mount Lemmon || Mount Lemmon Survey || EMA || align=right | 5.7 km || 
|}

266801–266900 

|-bgcolor=#d6d6d6
| 266801 ||  || — || September 18, 2009 || Catalina || CSS || — || align=right | 4.1 km || 
|-id=802 bgcolor=#d6d6d6
| 266802 ||  || — || September 22, 2009 || Mount Lemmon || Mount Lemmon Survey || — || align=right | 2.9 km || 
|-id=803 bgcolor=#d6d6d6
| 266803 ||  || — || September 17, 2009 || Kitt Peak || Spacewatch || — || align=right | 2.7 km || 
|-id=804 bgcolor=#E9E9E9
| 266804 ||  || — || September 17, 2009 || Kitt Peak || Spacewatch || — || align=right | 2.8 km || 
|-id=805 bgcolor=#d6d6d6
| 266805 ||  || — || September 26, 2009 || Kitt Peak || Spacewatch || — || align=right | 4.0 km || 
|-id=806 bgcolor=#d6d6d6
| 266806 ||  || — || September 29, 2009 || Mount Lemmon || Mount Lemmon Survey || 7:4 || align=right | 3.7 km || 
|-id=807 bgcolor=#d6d6d6
| 266807 ||  || — || September 18, 2009 || Mount Lemmon || Mount Lemmon Survey || — || align=right | 2.4 km || 
|-id=808 bgcolor=#C2FFFF
| 266808 ||  || — || October 12, 1998 || Kitt Peak || Spacewatch || L4ERY || align=right | 9.3 km || 
|-id=809 bgcolor=#E9E9E9
| 266809 ||  || — || September 22, 2009 || Kitt Peak || Spacewatch || — || align=right | 2.3 km || 
|-id=810 bgcolor=#E9E9E9
| 266810 ||  || — || September 23, 2009 || Kitt Peak || Spacewatch || — || align=right | 2.5 km || 
|-id=811 bgcolor=#d6d6d6
| 266811 ||  || — || September 25, 2009 || Kitt Peak || Spacewatch || HYG || align=right | 3.8 km || 
|-id=812 bgcolor=#d6d6d6
| 266812 ||  || — || September 18, 2009 || Catalina || CSS || EOS || align=right | 3.0 km || 
|-id=813 bgcolor=#C2FFFF
| 266813 ||  || — || September 24, 2009 || Mount Lemmon || Mount Lemmon Survey || L4 || align=right | 11 km || 
|-id=814 bgcolor=#d6d6d6
| 266814 ||  || — || October 13, 2009 || Mayhill || A. Lowe || EOS || align=right | 2.4 km || 
|-id=815 bgcolor=#d6d6d6
| 266815 ||  || — || October 11, 2009 || Mount Lemmon || Mount Lemmon Survey || THM || align=right | 4.6 km || 
|-id=816 bgcolor=#d6d6d6
| 266816 ||  || — || October 12, 2009 || La Sagra || OAM Obs. || — || align=right | 2.1 km || 
|-id=817 bgcolor=#d6d6d6
| 266817 ||  || — || October 11, 2009 || Mount Lemmon || Mount Lemmon Survey || — || align=right | 3.4 km || 
|-id=818 bgcolor=#d6d6d6
| 266818 ||  || — || October 12, 2009 || La Sagra || OAM Obs. || — || align=right | 3.8 km || 
|-id=819 bgcolor=#d6d6d6
| 266819 ||  || — || October 14, 2009 || Bergisch Gladbac || W. Bickel || — || align=right | 3.9 km || 
|-id=820 bgcolor=#d6d6d6
| 266820 ||  || — || October 12, 2009 || La Sagra || OAM Obs. || — || align=right | 3.9 km || 
|-id=821 bgcolor=#E9E9E9
| 266821 ||  || — || October 13, 2009 || La Sagra || OAM Obs. || PAD || align=right | 2.3 km || 
|-id=822 bgcolor=#d6d6d6
| 266822 ||  || — || October 8, 2004 || Kitt Peak || Spacewatch || — || align=right | 2.9 km || 
|-id=823 bgcolor=#d6d6d6
| 266823 ||  || — || October 14, 2009 || La Sagra || OAM Obs. || HYG || align=right | 3.5 km || 
|-id=824 bgcolor=#E9E9E9
| 266824 ||  || — || October 15, 2009 || La Sagra || OAM Obs. || — || align=right | 3.5 km || 
|-id=825 bgcolor=#d6d6d6
| 266825 ||  || — || October 12, 2009 || La Sagra || OAM Obs. || — || align=right | 4.3 km || 
|-id=826 bgcolor=#d6d6d6
| 266826 ||  || — || October 14, 2009 || Catalina || CSS || HYG || align=right | 2.9 km || 
|-id=827 bgcolor=#E9E9E9
| 266827 ||  || — || October 15, 2009 || Bergisch Gladbac || W. Bickel || AGN || align=right | 1.8 km || 
|-id=828 bgcolor=#fefefe
| 266828 ||  || — || October 8, 2009 || La Sagra || OAM Obs. || — || align=right | 1.4 km || 
|-id=829 bgcolor=#d6d6d6
| 266829 ||  || — || October 15, 2009 || Catalina || CSS || — || align=right | 3.5 km || 
|-id=830 bgcolor=#d6d6d6
| 266830 ||  || — || October 15, 2009 || Catalina || CSS || EOS || align=right | 3.3 km || 
|-id=831 bgcolor=#E9E9E9
| 266831 ||  || — || October 18, 2009 || Taunus || S. Karge, R. Kling || — || align=right | 2.2 km || 
|-id=832 bgcolor=#d6d6d6
| 266832 ||  || — || October 17, 2009 || Bisei SG Center || BATTeRS || — || align=right | 2.8 km || 
|-id=833 bgcolor=#fefefe
| 266833 ||  || — || October 19, 2009 || Socorro || LINEAR || — || align=right | 1.2 km || 
|-id=834 bgcolor=#d6d6d6
| 266834 ||  || — || October 16, 2009 || Mount Lemmon || Mount Lemmon Survey || HYG || align=right | 3.3 km || 
|-id=835 bgcolor=#d6d6d6
| 266835 ||  || — || October 20, 2009 || Bisei SG Center || BATTeRS || HYG || align=right | 2.9 km || 
|-id=836 bgcolor=#d6d6d6
| 266836 ||  || — || October 20, 2009 || Tzec Maun || J. Sachs || — || align=right | 4.7 km || 
|-id=837 bgcolor=#d6d6d6
| 266837 ||  || — || October 24, 2009 || Farra d'Isonzo || Farra d'Isonzo || LIX || align=right | 4.8 km || 
|-id=838 bgcolor=#E9E9E9
| 266838 ||  || — || October 16, 2009 || Catalina || CSS || — || align=right | 1.2 km || 
|-id=839 bgcolor=#d6d6d6
| 266839 ||  || — || October 17, 2009 || Mount Lemmon || Mount Lemmon Survey || — || align=right | 4.2 km || 
|-id=840 bgcolor=#E9E9E9
| 266840 ||  || — || October 18, 2009 || Mount Lemmon || Mount Lemmon Survey || — || align=right | 2.0 km || 
|-id=841 bgcolor=#E9E9E9
| 266841 ||  || — || October 21, 2009 || Mount Lemmon || Mount Lemmon Survey || AGN || align=right | 1.4 km || 
|-id=842 bgcolor=#d6d6d6
| 266842 ||  || — || October 18, 2009 || Mount Lemmon || Mount Lemmon Survey || KAR || align=right | 1.4 km || 
|-id=843 bgcolor=#d6d6d6
| 266843 ||  || — || October 18, 2009 || Mount Lemmon || Mount Lemmon Survey || — || align=right | 3.3 km || 
|-id=844 bgcolor=#d6d6d6
| 266844 ||  || — || October 18, 2009 || Mount Lemmon || Mount Lemmon Survey || — || align=right | 5.2 km || 
|-id=845 bgcolor=#E9E9E9
| 266845 ||  || — || October 18, 2009 || Mount Lemmon || Mount Lemmon Survey || — || align=right | 1.5 km || 
|-id=846 bgcolor=#d6d6d6
| 266846 ||  || — || October 18, 2009 || Mount Lemmon || Mount Lemmon Survey || KOR || align=right | 1.8 km || 
|-id=847 bgcolor=#E9E9E9
| 266847 ||  || — || October 18, 2009 || Mount Lemmon || Mount Lemmon Survey || AGN || align=right | 1.7 km || 
|-id=848 bgcolor=#E9E9E9
| 266848 ||  || — || October 22, 2009 || Kitt Peak || Spacewatch || HEN || align=right | 1.2 km || 
|-id=849 bgcolor=#E9E9E9
| 266849 ||  || — || October 17, 2009 || Mount Lemmon || Mount Lemmon Survey || NEM || align=right | 2.5 km || 
|-id=850 bgcolor=#E9E9E9
| 266850 ||  || — || November 6, 2005 || Mount Lemmon || Mount Lemmon Survey || — || align=right | 2.2 km || 
|-id=851 bgcolor=#C2FFFF
| 266851 ||  || — || February 27, 2001 || Kitt Peak || Spacewatch || L4 || align=right | 9.9 km || 
|-id=852 bgcolor=#E9E9E9
| 266852 ||  || — || October 24, 2009 || Catalina || CSS || AEO || align=right | 1.4 km || 
|-id=853 bgcolor=#d6d6d6
| 266853 ||  || — || October 21, 2009 || Catalina || CSS || 7:4 || align=right | 6.1 km || 
|-id=854 bgcolor=#d6d6d6
| 266854 Sezenaksu ||  ||  || October 24, 2009 || Nogales || J.-C. Merlin || — || align=right | 3.4 km || 
|-id=855 bgcolor=#E9E9E9
| 266855 ||  || — || October 22, 2009 || Mount Lemmon || Mount Lemmon Survey || AGN || align=right | 1.8 km || 
|-id=856 bgcolor=#fefefe
| 266856 ||  || — || October 23, 2009 || Mount Lemmon || Mount Lemmon Survey || — || align=right | 1.0 km || 
|-id=857 bgcolor=#d6d6d6
| 266857 ||  || — || October 23, 2009 || Mount Lemmon || Mount Lemmon Survey || — || align=right | 3.1 km || 
|-id=858 bgcolor=#d6d6d6
| 266858 ||  || — || October 23, 2009 || Mount Lemmon || Mount Lemmon Survey || — || align=right | 3.6 km || 
|-id=859 bgcolor=#d6d6d6
| 266859 ||  || — || October 23, 2009 || Kitt Peak || Spacewatch || — || align=right | 3.6 km || 
|-id=860 bgcolor=#E9E9E9
| 266860 ||  || — || October 23, 2009 || Kitt Peak || Spacewatch || — || align=right | 2.0 km || 
|-id=861 bgcolor=#d6d6d6
| 266861 ||  || — || October 25, 2009 || La Sagra || OAM Obs. || — || align=right | 3.6 km || 
|-id=862 bgcolor=#d6d6d6
| 266862 ||  || — || October 24, 2009 || Kitt Peak || Spacewatch || — || align=right | 3.4 km || 
|-id=863 bgcolor=#d6d6d6
| 266863 ||  || — || October 21, 2009 || Mount Lemmon || Mount Lemmon Survey || — || align=right | 4.0 km || 
|-id=864 bgcolor=#d6d6d6
| 266864 ||  || — || October 27, 2009 || Kitt Peak || Spacewatch || — || align=right | 3.3 km || 
|-id=865 bgcolor=#d6d6d6
| 266865 ||  || — || October 22, 2009 || Mount Lemmon || Mount Lemmon Survey || KOR || align=right | 1.8 km || 
|-id=866 bgcolor=#d6d6d6
| 266866 ||  || — || October 26, 2009 || Kitt Peak || Spacewatch || — || align=right | 3.7 km || 
|-id=867 bgcolor=#d6d6d6
| 266867 ||  || — || October 16, 2009 || Catalina || CSS || — || align=right | 4.3 km || 
|-id=868 bgcolor=#d6d6d6
| 266868 ||  || — || October 26, 2009 || Kitt Peak || Spacewatch || KOR || align=right | 1.5 km || 
|-id=869 bgcolor=#C2FFFF
| 266869 ||  || — || October 18, 2009 || Socorro || LINEAR || L4 || align=right | 13 km || 
|-id=870 bgcolor=#fefefe
| 266870 ||  || — || October 22, 2009 || Catalina || CSS || — || align=right | 1.2 km || 
|-id=871 bgcolor=#E9E9E9
| 266871 ||  || — || November 8, 2009 || Kitt Peak || Spacewatch || RAF || align=right | 1.4 km || 
|-id=872 bgcolor=#fefefe
| 266872 ||  || — || November 9, 2009 || Mount Lemmon || Mount Lemmon Survey || NYS || align=right data-sort-value="0.80" | 800 m || 
|-id=873 bgcolor=#d6d6d6
| 266873 ||  || — || November 9, 2009 || Mount Lemmon || Mount Lemmon Survey || — || align=right | 2.7 km || 
|-id=874 bgcolor=#d6d6d6
| 266874 ||  || — || November 9, 2009 || Mount Lemmon || Mount Lemmon Survey || — || align=right | 5.2 km || 
|-id=875 bgcolor=#d6d6d6
| 266875 ||  || — || November 9, 2009 || Kitt Peak || Spacewatch || — || align=right | 3.8 km || 
|-id=876 bgcolor=#d6d6d6
| 266876 ||  || — || November 10, 2009 || Mount Lemmon || Mount Lemmon Survey || K-2 || align=right | 1.5 km || 
|-id=877 bgcolor=#d6d6d6
| 266877 ||  || — || November 9, 2009 || Catalina || CSS || — || align=right | 3.6 km || 
|-id=878 bgcolor=#E9E9E9
| 266878 ||  || — || November 9, 2009 || Kitt Peak || Spacewatch || HOF || align=right | 2.7 km || 
|-id=879 bgcolor=#d6d6d6
| 266879 ||  || — || November 11, 2009 || Mount Lemmon || Mount Lemmon Survey || — || align=right | 2.8 km || 
|-id=880 bgcolor=#E9E9E9
| 266880 ||  || — || November 9, 2009 || Catalina || CSS || WIT || align=right | 1.7 km || 
|-id=881 bgcolor=#d6d6d6
| 266881 ||  || — || November 10, 2009 || Catalina || CSS || ARM || align=right | 6.6 km || 
|-id=882 bgcolor=#d6d6d6
| 266882 ||  || — || November 10, 2009 || Catalina || CSS || — || align=right | 4.1 km || 
|-id=883 bgcolor=#d6d6d6
| 266883 ||  || — || November 11, 2009 || Catalina || CSS || — || align=right | 2.8 km || 
|-id=884 bgcolor=#d6d6d6
| 266884 ||  || — || November 10, 2009 || Catalina || CSS || EOS || align=right | 2.7 km || 
|-id=885 bgcolor=#d6d6d6
| 266885 ||  || — || November 9, 2009 || Kitt Peak || Spacewatch || EOS || align=right | 2.7 km || 
|-id=886 bgcolor=#d6d6d6
| 266886 ||  || — || November 8, 2009 || Catalina || CSS || — || align=right | 4.2 km || 
|-id=887 bgcolor=#E9E9E9
| 266887 Wolfgangries ||  ||  || November 19, 2009 || Gaisberg || R. Gierlinger || — || align=right | 3.2 km || 
|-id=888 bgcolor=#E9E9E9
| 266888 ||  || — || November 18, 2009 || Mount Lemmon || Mount Lemmon Survey || — || align=right | 2.0 km || 
|-id=889 bgcolor=#d6d6d6
| 266889 ||  || — || November 18, 2009 || Mount Lemmon || Mount Lemmon Survey || TEL || align=right | 2.4 km || 
|-id=890 bgcolor=#E9E9E9
| 266890 ||  || — || November 19, 2009 || Mount Lemmon || Mount Lemmon Survey || — || align=right | 1.2 km || 
|-id=891 bgcolor=#d6d6d6
| 266891 ||  || — || November 19, 2009 || Mount Lemmon || Mount Lemmon Survey || 7:4 || align=right | 4.5 km || 
|-id=892 bgcolor=#d6d6d6
| 266892 ||  || — || November 19, 2009 || La Sagra || OAM Obs. || — || align=right | 2.9 km || 
|-id=893 bgcolor=#d6d6d6
| 266893 ||  || — || November 18, 2009 || Kitt Peak || Spacewatch || SHU3:2 || align=right | 5.2 km || 
|-id=894 bgcolor=#d6d6d6
| 266894 ||  || — || November 18, 2009 || La Sagra || OAM Obs. || 7:4 || align=right | 6.1 km || 
|-id=895 bgcolor=#d6d6d6
| 266895 ||  || — || November 18, 2009 || La Sagra || OAM Obs. || EOS || align=right | 3.0 km || 
|-id=896 bgcolor=#d6d6d6
| 266896 ||  || — || March 20, 2001 || Kitt Peak || Spacewatch || — || align=right | 3.0 km || 
|-id=897 bgcolor=#d6d6d6
| 266897 ||  || — || November 18, 2009 || La Sagra || OAM Obs. || EUP || align=right | 5.8 km || 
|-id=898 bgcolor=#C2FFFF
| 266898 ||  || — || August 24, 2008 || Kitt Peak || Spacewatch || L4 || align=right | 9.2 km || 
|-id=899 bgcolor=#E9E9E9
| 266899 ||  || — || November 26, 2009 || Mayhill || A. Lowe || AGN || align=right | 2.0 km || 
|-id=900 bgcolor=#d6d6d6
| 266900 ||  || — || November 17, 2009 || Catalina || CSS || THB || align=right | 6.7 km || 
|}

266901–267000 

|-bgcolor=#d6d6d6
| 266901 ||  || — || November 20, 2009 || Kitt Peak || Spacewatch || — || align=right | 3.0 km || 
|-id=902 bgcolor=#d6d6d6
| 266902 ||  || — || November 19, 2009 || Mount Lemmon || Mount Lemmon Survey || HYG || align=right | 3.2 km || 
|-id=903 bgcolor=#d6d6d6
| 266903 ||  || — || November 20, 2009 || Kitt Peak || Spacewatch || — || align=right | 3.4 km || 
|-id=904 bgcolor=#d6d6d6
| 266904 ||  || — || November 23, 2009 || Kitt Peak || Spacewatch || — || align=right | 3.9 km || 
|-id=905 bgcolor=#d6d6d6
| 266905 ||  || — || November 23, 2009 || Mount Lemmon || Mount Lemmon Survey || — || align=right | 4.7 km || 
|-id=906 bgcolor=#E9E9E9
| 266906 ||  || — || November 24, 2009 || Mount Lemmon || Mount Lemmon Survey || — || align=right | 3.3 km || 
|-id=907 bgcolor=#d6d6d6
| 266907 ||  || — || November 16, 2009 || Kitt Peak || Spacewatch || — || align=right | 3.0 km || 
|-id=908 bgcolor=#d6d6d6
| 266908 ||  || — || November 18, 2009 || Kitt Peak || Spacewatch || 3:2 || align=right | 4.6 km || 
|-id=909 bgcolor=#d6d6d6
| 266909 ||  || — || November 16, 2009 || Mount Lemmon || Mount Lemmon Survey || — || align=right | 2.3 km || 
|-id=910 bgcolor=#d6d6d6
| 266910 ||  || — || November 18, 2009 || Mount Lemmon || Mount Lemmon Survey || — || align=right | 2.9 km || 
|-id=911 bgcolor=#d6d6d6
| 266911 ||  || — || November 17, 2009 || Catalina || CSS || — || align=right | 5.3 km || 
|-id=912 bgcolor=#d6d6d6
| 266912 ||  || — || November 18, 2009 || Mount Lemmon || Mount Lemmon Survey || — || align=right | 4.0 km || 
|-id=913 bgcolor=#d6d6d6
| 266913 ||  || — || August 23, 2003 || Palomar || NEAT || — || align=right | 3.7 km || 
|-id=914 bgcolor=#d6d6d6
| 266914 ||  || — || November 25, 2009 || Kitt Peak || Spacewatch || — || align=right | 2.9 km || 
|-id=915 bgcolor=#E9E9E9
| 266915 ||  || — || December 11, 2009 || Catalina || CSS || — || align=right | 3.0 km || 
|-id=916 bgcolor=#fefefe
| 266916 ||  || — || December 17, 2009 || Kitt Peak || Spacewatch || — || align=right | 1.3 km || 
|-id=917 bgcolor=#fefefe
| 266917 ||  || — || January 4, 2010 || Kitt Peak || Spacewatch || V || align=right data-sort-value="0.88" | 880 m || 
|-id=918 bgcolor=#d6d6d6
| 266918 ||  || — || January 13, 2010 || Kitt Peak || Spacewatch || 7:4 || align=right | 3.9 km || 
|-id=919 bgcolor=#E9E9E9
| 266919 ||  || — || January 17, 2010 || WISE || WISE || — || align=right | 2.7 km || 
|-id=920 bgcolor=#fefefe
| 266920 ||  || — || February 9, 2010 || Kitt Peak || Spacewatch || — || align=right | 1.0 km || 
|-id=921 bgcolor=#E9E9E9
| 266921 Culhane ||  ||  || February 14, 2010 || WISE || WISE || — || align=right | 2.3 km || 
|-id=922 bgcolor=#d6d6d6
| 266922 ||  || — || February 6, 2010 || Kitt Peak || Spacewatch || — || align=right | 2.3 km || 
|-id=923 bgcolor=#d6d6d6
| 266923 ||  || — || February 16, 2010 || Socorro || LINEAR || — || align=right | 5.2 km || 
|-id=924 bgcolor=#d6d6d6
| 266924 ||  || — || February 21, 2010 || WISE || WISE || LUT || align=right | 6.4 km || 
|-id=925 bgcolor=#E9E9E9
| 266925 ||  || — || March 12, 2010 || Catalina || CSS || — || align=right | 2.4 km || 
|-id=926 bgcolor=#d6d6d6
| 266926 ||  || — || March 12, 2010 || Kitt Peak || Spacewatch || — || align=right | 2.7 km || 
|-id=927 bgcolor=#d6d6d6
| 266927 ||  || — || March 12, 2010 || Kitt Peak || Spacewatch || — || align=right | 2.8 km || 
|-id=928 bgcolor=#d6d6d6
| 266928 ||  || — || March 18, 2010 || Kitt Peak || Spacewatch || — || align=right | 3.4 km || 
|-id=929 bgcolor=#d6d6d6
| 266929 ||  || — || April 12, 2010 || Kitt Peak || Spacewatch || — || align=right | 3.9 km || 
|-id=930 bgcolor=#E9E9E9
| 266930 ||  || — || April 21, 2010 || WISE || WISE || MIS || align=right | 2.0 km || 
|-id=931 bgcolor=#d6d6d6
| 266931 ||  || — || May 12, 2010 || Kitt Peak || Spacewatch || EOS || align=right | 2.6 km || 
|-id=932 bgcolor=#d6d6d6
| 266932 ||  || — || May 8, 2010 || Mount Lemmon || Mount Lemmon Survey || — || align=right | 4.1 km || 
|-id=933 bgcolor=#E9E9E9
| 266933 ||  || — || June 30, 2010 || WISE || WISE || — || align=right | 2.9 km || 
|-id=934 bgcolor=#E9E9E9
| 266934 ||  || — || October 23, 2001 || Kitt Peak || Spacewatch || — || align=right | 2.4 km || 
|-id=935 bgcolor=#fefefe
| 266935 ||  || — || July 13, 1999 || Socorro || LINEAR || — || align=right | 1.4 km || 
|-id=936 bgcolor=#d6d6d6
| 266936 ||  || — || September 30, 2005 || Palomar || NEAT || — || align=right | 4.2 km || 
|-id=937 bgcolor=#fefefe
| 266937 ||  || — || August 2, 2010 || Socorro || LINEAR || — || align=right data-sort-value="0.91" | 910 m || 
|-id=938 bgcolor=#fefefe
| 266938 ||  || — || August 13, 2010 || Socorro || LINEAR || H || align=right data-sort-value="0.86" | 860 m || 
|-id=939 bgcolor=#d6d6d6
| 266939 ||  || — || October 7, 2004 || Kitt Peak || Spacewatch || HYG || align=right | 4.1 km || 
|-id=940 bgcolor=#E9E9E9
| 266940 ||  || — || September 12, 2001 || Kitt Peak || Spacewatch || — || align=right | 2.4 km || 
|-id=941 bgcolor=#d6d6d6
| 266941 ||  || — || August 31, 2005 || Kitt Peak || Spacewatch || KOR || align=right | 1.6 km || 
|-id=942 bgcolor=#fefefe
| 266942 ||  || — || August 15, 2006 || Palomar || NEAT || V || align=right data-sort-value="0.86" | 860 m || 
|-id=943 bgcolor=#d6d6d6
| 266943 ||  || — || October 22, 2005 || Kitt Peak || Spacewatch || — || align=right | 3.3 km || 
|-id=944 bgcolor=#E9E9E9
| 266944 ||  || — || May 15, 2005 || Mount Lemmon || Mount Lemmon Survey || — || align=right | 1.3 km || 
|-id=945 bgcolor=#fefefe
| 266945 ||  || — || July 21, 2006 || Catalina || CSS || V || align=right data-sort-value="0.78" | 780 m || 
|-id=946 bgcolor=#fefefe
| 266946 ||  || — || November 10, 1999 || Kitt Peak || Spacewatch || — || align=right data-sort-value="0.83" | 830 m || 
|-id=947 bgcolor=#d6d6d6
| 266947 ||  || — || November 3, 2004 || Catalina || CSS || — || align=right | 4.1 km || 
|-id=948 bgcolor=#fefefe
| 266948 ||  || — || August 20, 2006 || Palomar || NEAT || — || align=right | 1.2 km || 
|-id=949 bgcolor=#fefefe
| 266949 ||  || — || April 10, 2005 || Mount Lemmon || Mount Lemmon Survey || V || align=right data-sort-value="0.92" | 920 m || 
|-id=950 bgcolor=#fefefe
| 266950 ||  || — || November 29, 2003 || Kitt Peak || Spacewatch || FLO || align=right data-sort-value="0.71" | 710 m || 
|-id=951 bgcolor=#fefefe
| 266951 ||  || — || June 4, 2006 || Mount Lemmon || Mount Lemmon Survey || — || align=right data-sort-value="0.96" | 960 m || 
|-id=952 bgcolor=#E9E9E9
| 266952 ||  || — || September 26, 2005 || Kitt Peak || Spacewatch || HOF || align=right | 3.0 km || 
|-id=953 bgcolor=#C2FFFF
| 266953 ||  || — || October 25, 1997 || Caussols || ODAS || L4 || align=right | 12 km || 
|-id=954 bgcolor=#E9E9E9
| 266954 ||  || — || August 28, 2005 || Kitt Peak || Spacewatch || — || align=right | 1.5 km || 
|-id=955 bgcolor=#E9E9E9
| 266955 ||  || — || October 21, 2001 || Socorro || LINEAR || — || align=right | 2.0 km || 
|-id=956 bgcolor=#fefefe
| 266956 ||  || — || June 18, 2006 || Kitt Peak || Spacewatch || NYS || align=right data-sort-value="0.73" | 730 m || 
|-id=957 bgcolor=#d6d6d6
| 266957 ||  || — || November 20, 2004 || Kitt Peak || Spacewatch || 7:4 || align=right | 3.5 km || 
|-id=958 bgcolor=#fefefe
| 266958 ||  || — || March 2, 2006 || Catalina || CSS || H || align=right data-sort-value="0.69" | 690 m || 
|-id=959 bgcolor=#d6d6d6
| 266959 ||  || — || December 6, 2000 || Kitt Peak || Spacewatch || — || align=right | 2.8 km || 
|-id=960 bgcolor=#E9E9E9
| 266960 ||  || — || May 23, 2001 || Cerro Tololo || M. W. Buie || — || align=right | 1.8 km || 
|-id=961 bgcolor=#E9E9E9
| 266961 ||  || — || October 21, 2001 || Socorro || LINEAR || — || align=right | 1.8 km || 
|-id=962 bgcolor=#C2FFFF
| 266962 ||  || — || September 15, 2009 || Kitt Peak || Spacewatch || L4 || align=right | 10 km || 
|-id=963 bgcolor=#fefefe
| 266963 ||  || — || December 28, 2003 || Kitt Peak || Spacewatch || NYS || align=right data-sort-value="0.78" | 780 m || 
|-id=964 bgcolor=#d6d6d6
| 266964 ||  || — || October 6, 2004 || Kitt Peak || Spacewatch || — || align=right | 4.8 km || 
|-id=965 bgcolor=#C2FFFF
| 266965 ||  || — || April 1, 2003 || Apache Point || SDSS || L4 || align=right | 15 km || 
|-id=966 bgcolor=#fefefe
| 266966 ||  || — || November 5, 1994 || Kitt Peak || Spacewatch || — || align=right data-sort-value="0.89" | 890 m || 
|-id=967 bgcolor=#d6d6d6
| 266967 ||  || — || October 8, 1994 || Kitt Peak || Spacewatch || — || align=right | 3.3 km || 
|-id=968 bgcolor=#d6d6d6
| 266968 ||  || — || November 30, 2005 || Kitt Peak || Spacewatch || — || align=right | 2.5 km || 
|-id=969 bgcolor=#E9E9E9
| 266969 ||  || — || March 21, 1999 || Apache Point || SDSS || — || align=right | 1.6 km || 
|-id=970 bgcolor=#fefefe
| 266970 ||  || — || October 24, 1995 || Kitt Peak || Spacewatch || NYS || align=right data-sort-value="0.71" | 710 m || 
|-id=971 bgcolor=#d6d6d6
| 266971 ||  || — || February 17, 2001 || Haleakala || NEAT || — || align=right | 4.5 km || 
|-id=972 bgcolor=#d6d6d6
| 266972 ||  || — || December 1, 2005 || Kitt Peak || Spacewatch || EOS || align=right | 2.7 km || 
|-id=973 bgcolor=#fefefe
| 266973 ||  || — || August 18, 2006 || Kitt Peak || Spacewatch || NYS || align=right data-sort-value="0.71" | 710 m || 
|-id=974 bgcolor=#fefefe
| 266974 ||  || — || October 9, 1993 || La Silla || E. W. Elst || — || align=right data-sort-value="0.69" | 690 m || 
|-id=975 bgcolor=#fefefe
| 266975 ||  || — || September 6, 1999 || Kitt Peak || Spacewatch || — || align=right data-sort-value="0.95" | 950 m || 
|-id=976 bgcolor=#fefefe
| 266976 ||  || — || September 19, 2003 || Kitt Peak || Spacewatch || NYS || align=right data-sort-value="0.62" | 620 m || 
|-id=977 bgcolor=#d6d6d6
| 266977 ||  || — || January 16, 2005 || Kitt Peak || Spacewatch || — || align=right | 4.1 km || 
|-id=978 bgcolor=#E9E9E9
| 266978 ||  || — || November 20, 2001 || Kitt Peak || Spacewatch || — || align=right | 2.9 km || 
|-id=979 bgcolor=#C2FFFF
| 266979 ||  || — || October 6, 2008 || Mount Lemmon || Mount Lemmon Survey || L4 || align=right | 12 km || 
|-id=980 bgcolor=#E9E9E9
| 266980 ||  || — || May 5, 2003 || Kitt Peak || Spacewatch || AEO || align=right | 1.5 km || 
|-id=981 bgcolor=#fefefe
| 266981 ||  || — || July 25, 2003 || Palomar || NEAT || — || align=right data-sort-value="0.89" | 890 m || 
|-id=982 bgcolor=#C2FFFF
| 266982 ||  || — || July 21, 2007 || Lulin || Q.-z. Ye || L4 || align=right | 12 km || 
|-id=983 bgcolor=#d6d6d6
| 266983 Josepbosch ||  ||  || November 30, 2005 || Kitt Peak || Spacewatch || — || align=right | 4.9 km || 
|-id=984 bgcolor=#d6d6d6
| 266984 ||  || — || November 30, 2000 || Kitt Peak || Spacewatch || — || align=right | 2.8 km || 
|-id=985 bgcolor=#d6d6d6
| 266985 ||  || — || January 29, 2007 || Kitt Peak || Spacewatch || HYG || align=right | 4.3 km || 
|-id=986 bgcolor=#E9E9E9
| 266986 ||  || — || February 22, 1998 || Kitt Peak || Spacewatch || HEN || align=right | 1.2 km || 
|-id=987 bgcolor=#E9E9E9
| 266987 ||  || — || July 28, 2005 || Palomar || NEAT || — || align=right | 3.0 km || 
|-id=988 bgcolor=#C2FFFF
| 266988 ||  || — || April 11, 2003 || Kitt Peak || Spacewatch || L4 || align=right | 13 km || 
|-id=989 bgcolor=#E9E9E9
| 266989 ||  || — || April 21, 2003 || Kitt Peak || Spacewatch || — || align=right | 2.9 km || 
|-id=990 bgcolor=#E9E9E9
| 266990 ||  || — || July 18, 2001 || Palomar || NEAT || — || align=right | 1.2 km || 
|-id=991 bgcolor=#fefefe
| 266991 ||  || — || July 30, 2005 || Palomar || NEAT || V || align=right data-sort-value="0.89" | 890 m || 
|-id=992 bgcolor=#C2FFFF
| 266992 ||  || — || November 16, 1998 || Kitt Peak || Spacewatch || L4slow? || align=right | 13 km || 
|-id=993 bgcolor=#d6d6d6
| 266993 ||  || — || July 8, 2003 || Palomar || NEAT || — || align=right | 4.7 km || 
|-id=994 bgcolor=#d6d6d6
| 266994 ||  || — || February 13, 2001 || Kitt Peak || Spacewatch || — || align=right | 3.4 km || 
|-id=995 bgcolor=#C2FFFF
| 266995 ||  || — || January 16, 2000 || Kitt Peak || Spacewatch || L4 || align=right | 12 km || 
|-id=996 bgcolor=#C2FFFF
| 266996 ||  || — || October 1, 2009 || Mount Lemmon || Mount Lemmon Survey || L4 || align=right | 15 km || 
|-id=997 bgcolor=#E9E9E9
| 266997 ||  || — || June 13, 2001 || Kitt Peak || Spacewatch || — || align=right | 1.7 km || 
|-id=998 bgcolor=#fefefe
| 266998 ||  || — || January 23, 2004 || Anderson Mesa || LONEOS || — || align=right | 1.1 km || 
|-id=999 bgcolor=#fefefe
| 266999 ||  || — || October 22, 1960 || Palomar || PLS || — || align=right | 1.1 km || 
|-id=000 bgcolor=#fefefe
| 267000 ||  || — || September 25, 1960 || Palomar || PLS || FLO || align=right data-sort-value="0.73" | 730 m || 
|}

References

External links 
 Discovery Circumstances: Numbered Minor Planets (265001)–(270000) (IAU Minor Planet Center)

0266